= 2003 Davis Cup Americas Zone Group II =

International tennis competition

The Americas Zone was one of the three zones of the regional Davis Cup competition in 2003.

In the Americas Zone there were four different tiers, called groups, in which teams compete against each other to advance to the upper tier. Winners in Group II advanced to the Americas Zone Group I. Teams who lost their respective ties competed in the relegation play-offs, with winning teams remaining in Group II, whereas teams who lost their play-offs were relegated to the Americas Zone Group III in 2004.

== Participating nations ==
- Colombia
- Cuba
- Dominican Republic
- Haiti
- Mexico
- Netherlands Antilles
- Paraguay
- Uruguay

=== Draw ===
Play-offs
Willemstad, Curaçao (hard)
Netherlands Antilles	2
Haiti	3
Montevideo, Uruguay (clay)
3	Colombia	2
2	Uruguay	3

First Round
Aguascalientes, Mexico (indoor carpet)
1	Mexico	5
Netherlands Antilles	0
Asunción, Paraguay (clay)
4	Paraguay	5
Haiti	0
Havana, Cuba (hard)
Cuba	5
3	Colombia	0
Maldonado, Uruguay (clay)
Dominican Republic	4
2	Uruguay	1

Second Round
Asunción, Paraguay (clay)
1	Mexico	1
4	Paraguay	4
Santo Domingo, Dominican Rep. (clay)
Cuba	1
Dominican Republic	4

Third Round
Santo Domingo, Dominican Rep. (hard)
4	Paraguay	4
Dominican Republic	1

- Netherlands Antilles and Colombia relegated to Group III in 2004.
- Paraguay promoted to Group I in 2004.

== First round ==
=== Mexico vs. Netherlands Antilles ===
Mexico
5
Instituto del Deporte de Aguascalientes, Aguascalientes, Mexico
7–9 February 2003
Carpet (indoors)

Netherlands Antilles
0

			1	2	3	4	5
1	(Mexico) (Netherlands Antilles)	Miguel Gallardo Valles; Kevin Jonckheer	6; 4	6; 4	6; 4
2	(Mexico) (Netherlands Antilles)	Luis-Manuel Flores; Elmar Gerth	6; 2	6; 0	6; 2
3	(Mexico) (Netherlands Antilles)	Guillermo Carter / Bruno Echagaray; Piet Hein Boekel / Elmar Gerth	7; 5	6; 4	6; 3
4	(Mexico) (Netherlands Antilles)	Guillermo Carter; Piet Hein Boekel	6^{3} 7^{7}	6; 2	6; 0
5	(Mexico) (Netherlands Antilles)	Luis-Manuel Flores; Leroy Tujeehut	6; 1	6; 1

=== Paraguay vs. Haiti ===
Paraguay
5
Yacht Y Golf Club Paraguayo, Asunción, Paraguay
7–9 February 2003
Clay

Haiti
0

			1	2	3	4	5
1	(Paraguay) (Haiti)	Francisco Rodríguez; Jerry Joseph	6; 1	6; 3	6; 0
2	(Paraguay) (Haiti)	Paulo Carvallo; Iphton Louis	6; 0	6^{7} 7^{9}	6; 4	2; 6	6; 1
3	(Paraguay) (Haiti)	Paulo Carvallo / Francisco Rodríguez; Joel Allen / Iphton Louis	7^{7} 6^{3}	7; 1	7^{9} 6^{7}
4	(Paraguay) (Haiti)	Gustavo Ramírez; Joel Allen	6; 0	6; 2
5	(Paraguay) (Haiti)	Emilio Báez Brítez; Jerry Joseph	6; 0	6; 1

=== Cuba vs. Colombia ===
Cuba
5
Centro Nacional de Tenis, Havana, Cuba
7–9 February 2003
Hard

Colombia
0

			1	2	3	4	5
1	(Cuba) (Colombia)	Ricardo Chile; Carlos Salamanca	6; 4	6; 3	6; 4
2	(Cuba) (Colombia)	Lázaro Navarro; Daniel Isaza	6; 2	7^{7} 6^{1}	6; 1
3	(Cuba) (Colombia)	Sandor Martínez / Lázaro Navarro; Daniel Isaza / Carlos Salamanca	7^{8} 6^{6}	6; 1	3; 6	6; 3
4	(Cuba) (Colombia)	Eddy Gonzalez-Gonzalez; Carlos Salamanca	6; 4	7; 5
5	(Cuba) (Colombia)	Sandor Martínez; Daniel Isaza	6; 4	6; 2

=== Uruguay vs. Dominican Republic ===
Uruguay
1
Cantegrill Country Club, Maldonado, Uruguay
7–9 February 2003
Clay

Dominican Republic
4

			1	2	3	4	5
1	(Uruguay) (Dominican Republic)	Marcel Felder; Jhonson García	3; 6	6^{3} 7^{7}	5; 7
2	(Uruguay) (Dominican Republic)	Martín Vilarrubí; Víctor Estrella Burgos	7; 5	4; 6	4; 6	4; 6
3	(Uruguay) (Dominican Republic)	Marcel Felder / Martín Vilarrubí; Víctor Estrella Burgos / Jhonson García	7^{7} 6^{2}	4; 6	4; 6	4; 6
4	(Uruguay) (Dominican Republic)	Marcel Felder; Jose Bernard	6; 0	6; 2
5	(Uruguay) (Dominican Republic)	Martín Vilarrubí; Jhonson García	2; 6	4; 6

== Second round ==
=== Paraguay vs. Mexico ===
Paraguay
4
Yacht Y Golf Club Paraguayo, Asunción, Paraguay
4–6 April 2003
Clay

Mexico
1

			1	2	3	4	5
1	(Paraguay) (Mexico)	Paulo Carvallo; Miguel Gallardo Valles	6; 1	7^{7} 6^{4}	6; 4
2	(Paraguay) (Mexico)	Francisco Rodríguez; Bruno Echagaray	6; 0	6; 2	2; 6	0; 6	6; 1
3	(Paraguay) (Mexico)	Paulo Carvallo / Francisco Rodríguez; Bruno Echagaray / Santiago González	6; 1	1; 6	0; 6	6; 2	6; 2
4	(Paraguay) (Mexico)	Francisco Rodríguez; Miguel Gallardo Valles	2; 1					retired
5	(Paraguay) (Mexico)	Ricardo Mena; Santiago González	4; 6	6; 4	2; 6

=== Dominican Republic vs. Cuba ===
Dominican Republic
4
Santo Domingo Tennis Club, Santo Domingo, Dominican Republic
4–6 April 2003
Clay

Cuba
1

			1	2	3	4	5
1	(Dominican Republic) (Cuba)	Víctor Estrella Burgos; Ricardo Chile	6; 2	6; 2	6; 3
2	(Dominican Republic) (Cuba)	Jhonson García; Lázaro Navarro	6; 4	6; 4	7; 5
3	(Dominican Republic) (Cuba)	Víctor Estrella Burgos / Jhonson García; Sandor Martínez / Lázaro Navarro	7^{7} 6^{4}	7^{7} 6^{5}	6; 3
4	(Dominican Republic) (Cuba)	Jose Bernard; Sandor Martínez	6; 2	6; 2
5	(Dominican Republic) (Cuba)	Jose-Antonio Velazquez; Ricardo Chile	0; 6	1; 6

== Relegation play-offs ==
=== Netherlands Antilles vs. Haiti ===
Netherlands Antilles
2
Santa Catharina Sport & Country Club, Willemstad, Netherlands Antilles
4–6 April 2003
Hard

Haiti
3

			1	2	3	4	5
1	(Netherlands Antilles) (Haiti)	Elmar Gerth; Iphton Louis	4; 6	4; 6	1; 6
2	(Netherlands Antilles) (Haiti)	Jean-Julien Rojer; Bertrand Madsen	6; 3	7; 5	6; 0
3	(Netherlands Antilles) (Haiti)	Kevin Jonckheer / Jean-Julien Rojer; Iphton Louis / Bertrand Madsen	6^{3} 7^{7}	7; 5	4; 6	6; 3	3; 6
4	(Netherlands Antilles) (Haiti)	Jean-Julien Rojer; Iphton Louis	6; 1	6; 2	6; 3
5	(Netherlands Antilles) (Haiti)	Raoul Behr; Bertrand Madsen	1; 6	7^{7} 6^{5}	6^{5} 7^{7}	2; 6

=== Uruguay vs. Colombia ===
Uruguay
3
Carrasco Lawn Tennis, Montevideo, Uruguay
4–6 April 2003
Clay

Colombia
2

			1	2	3	4	5
1	(Uruguay) (Colombia)	Federico Dondo; Pablo González	6; 4	6; 2	6; 1
2	(Uruguay) (Colombia)	Martín Vilarrubí; Michael Quintero	0; 6	4; 6	7^{7} 6^{5}	1; 6
3	(Uruguay) (Colombia)	Marcel Felder / Martín Vilarrubí; Pablo González / Michael Quintero	6; 3	6; 0	6; 3
4	(Uruguay) (Colombia)	Federico Dondo; Michael Quintero	3; 6	5; 7	6^{9} 7^{11}
5	(Uruguay) (Colombia)	Martín Vilarrubí; Pablo González	6; 3	7; 5	4; 6	6; 3

== Third round ==
=== Dominican Republic vs. Paraguay ===
Dominican Republic
1
Centro Nacional de Tenis, Santo Domingo, Dominican Republic
19–21 September 2003
Hard

Paraguay
4

			1	2	3	4	5
1	(Dominican Republic) (Paraguay)	Víctor Estrella Burgos; Francisco Rodríguez	4; 6	2; 6	6; 1	6; 4	6; 4
2	(Dominican Republic) (Paraguay)	Jhonson García; Ramón Delgado	1; 6	2; 6	4; 6
3	(Dominican Republic) (Paraguay)	Víctor Estrella Burgos / Jhonson García; Paulo Carvallo / Ramón Delgado	2; 6	3; 6	4; 6
4	(Dominican Republic) (Paraguay)	Víctor Estrella Burgos; Ramón Delgado	2; 6	2; 6	1; 6
5	(Dominican Republic) (Paraguay)	Jhonson García; Francisco Rodrígueze	4; 6	4; 6
