= 2002 Davis Cup Americas Zone Group II =

International tennis competition

The Americas Zone was one of the three zones of the regional Davis Cup competition in 2002.

In the Americas Zone there were four different tiers, called groups, in which teams compete against each other to advance to the upper tier. Winners in Group II advanced to the Americas Zone Group I. Teams who lost their respective ties competed in the relegation play-offs, with winning teams remaining in Group II, whereas teams who lost their play-offs were relegated to the Americas Zone Group III in 2003.

== Participating nations ==
- Colombia
- Cuba
- Guatemala
- Netherlands Antilles
- Paraguay
- Peru
- Trinidad and Tobago
- Uruguay

=== Draw ===
Play-offs
Guatemala City, Guatemala (hard)
Guatemala	2
Netherlands Antilles	3
Havana, Cuba (hard)
Cuba	5
Trinidad and Tobago	0

First Round
Guatemala City, Guatemala (hard)
1	Peru	4
Guatemala	1
Asunción, Paraguay (clay)
Netherlands Antilles	0
Paraguay	5
Villavicencio, Colombia (clay)
Cuba	0
Colombia	5
Port of Spain, Trinidad (hard)
Trinidad and Tobago	0
2	Uruguay	5

Second Round
Lambaré, Paraguay (clay)
1	Peru	3
Paraguay	2
Villavicencio, Colombia (clay)
Colombia	2
2	Uruguay	3

Third Round
Montevideo, Uruguay (clay)
1	Peru	4
2	Uruguay	1

- Guatemala and Trinidad and Tobago relegated to Group III in 2003.
- Peru promoted to Group I in 2003.

== First round ==
=== Guatemala vs. Peru ===
Guatemala
1
Guatemala City, Guatemala
8–10 February 2002
Hard

Peru
4

			1	2	3	4	5
1	(Guatemala) (Peru)	Rodrigo Gabriel; Luis Horna	0; 6	0; 6	1; 6
2	(Guatemala) (Peru)	Jacobo Chávez; Iván Miranda	1; 6	2; 6	7; 5	6; 3	6; 4
3	(Guatemala) (Peru)	Jacobo Chávez / Cristian Paiz; Luis Horna / Iván Miranda	6; 4	3; 6	6; 3	3; 6	5; 7
4	(Guatemala) (Peru)	Jacobo Chávez; Luis Horna	3; 6	4; 6	2; 6
5	(Guatemala) (Peru)	Cristian Paiz; Mario Monroy	5; 7	3; 6

=== Paraguay vs. Netherlands Antilles ===
Paraguay
5
Asunción, Paraguay
8–10 February 2002
Clay

Netherlands Antilles
0

			1	2	3	4	5
1	(Paraguay) (Netherlands Antilles)	Francisco Rodríguez; Elmar Gerth	6; 4	6; 1	6; 3
2	(Paraguay) (Netherlands Antilles)	Ramón Delgado; Raoul Behr	6; 1	6; 0	6; 1
3	(Paraguay) (Netherlands Antilles)	Paulo Carvallo / Ramón Delgado; Piet Hein Boekel / Elmar Gerth	6; 4	6; 4	6; 2
4	(Paraguay) (Netherlands Antilles)	Emilio Báez Brítez; Piet Hein Boekel	6; 1	6; 1
5	(Paraguay) (Netherlands Antilles)	Francisco Rodríguez; Raoul Behr	6; 1	6; 2

=== Colombia vs. Cuba ===
Colombia
5
Villavicencio, Colombia
8–10 February 2002
Clay

Cuba
0

			1	2	3	4	5
1	(Colombia) (Cuba)	Pablo González; Lázaro Navarro	6; 4	7; 5	6; 4
2	(Colombia) (Cuba)	Michael Quintero; Ricardo Chile	6; 3	6; 3	6; 3
3	(Colombia) (Cuba)	Pablo González / Carlos Salamanca; Sandor Martínez / Lázaro Navarro	7^{8} 6^{6}	7^{7} 6^{3}	6; 2
4	(Colombia) (Cuba)	Michael Quintero; Sandor Martínez	3; 6	7^{7} 6^{5}	6; 2
5	(Colombia) (Cuba)	Pablo González; Ricardo Chile	6; 0	6; 4

=== Trinidad and Tobago vs. Uruguay ===
Trinidad and Tobago
0
Port of Spain, Trinidad and Tobago
8–10 February 2002
Hard

Uruguay
5

			1	2	3	4	5
1	(Trinidad and Tobago) (Uruguay)	Shane Stone; Martín Vilarrubí	2; 6	2; 6	6^{4} 7^{7}
2	(Trinidad and Tobago) (Uruguay)	Troy Stone; Federico Dondo	4; 6	3; 6	1; 6
3	(Trinidad and Tobago) (Uruguay)	Shane Stone / Troy Stone; Marcelo Barboza / Marcel Felder	7; 5	6; 1	5; 7	6^{7} 7^{9}	4; 6
4	(Trinidad and Tobago) (Uruguay)	Tyler Mayers; Marcel Felder	3; 6	0; 6
5	(Trinidad and Tobago) (Uruguay)	Ivor Grazette; Martín Vilarrubí	0; 6	0; 6

== Second round ==
=== Paraguay vs. Peru ===
Paraguay
2
Yacht & Golf Club, Lambaré, Paraguay
5–7 April 2002
Clay

Peru
3

			1	2	3	4	5
1	(Paraguay) (Peru)	Ramón Delgado; Iván Miranda	6; 3	7; 5	6; 4
2	(Paraguay) (Peru)	Francisco Rodríguez; Luis Horna	6^{6} 7^{8}	4; 6	2; 6
3	(Paraguay) (Peru)	Paulo Carvallo / Ramón Delgado; Luis Horna / Iván Miranda	4; 6	6^{7} 7^{9}	3; 6
4	(Paraguay) (Peru)	Ramón Delgado; Luis Horna	2; 6	6^{4} 7^{7}	5; 7
5	(Paraguay) (Peru)	Francisco Rodríguez; Mario Monroy	6; 2	7; 5

=== Colombia vs. Uruguay ===
Colombia
2
Sikuani Park, Villavicencio, Colombia
5–7 April 2002
Clay

Uruguay
3

			1	2	3	4	5
1	(Colombia) (Uruguay)	Pablo González; Pablo Bianchi	7; 5	4; 6	6; 0	6; 2
2	(Colombia) (Uruguay)	Michael Quintero; Federico Dondo	6^{4} 7^{7}	3; 6	4; 6
3	(Colombia) (Uruguay)	Alejandro Falla / Carlos Salamanca; Marcelo Barboza / Federico Dondo	6; 0	6^{5} 7^{7}	4; 6	4; 6
4	(Colombia) (Uruguay)	Alejandro Falla; Pablo Bianchi	6; 2	7; 5	7; 5
5	(Colombia) (Uruguay)	Pablo González; Federico Dondo	7^{7} 6^{3}	4; 6	1; 6	4; 6

== Relegation play-offs ==
=== Guatemala vs. Netherlands Antilles ===
Guatemala
2
National Centre, Guatemala City, Guatemala
5–7 April 2002
Hard

Netherlands Antilles
3

			1	2	3	4	5
1	(Guatemala) (Netherlands Antilles)	Luis Pérez Chete; Jean-Julien Rojer	3; 6	7^{7} 6^{4}	3; 6	4; 6
2	(Guatemala) (Netherlands Antilles)	Jacobo Chávez; Elmar Gerth	6; 1	6; 2	6; 1
3	(Guatemala) (Netherlands Antilles)	Jacobo Chávez / Luis Pérez Chete; Elmar Gerth / Jean-Julien Rojer	6^{5} 7^{7}	6; 3	3; 6	4; 6
4	(Guatemala) (Netherlands Antilles)	Jacobo Chávez; Jean-Julien Rojer	1; 6	4; 6	3; 6
5	(Guatemala) (Netherlands Antilles)	Cristian Paiz; Raoul Behr	6; 2	6; 3

=== Cuba vs. Trinidad and Tobago ===
Cuba
5
Havana Club, Havana, Cuba
5–7 April 2002
Hard

Trinidad and Tobago
0

			1	2	3	4	5
1	(Cuba) (Trinidad and Tobago)	Ricardo Chile; Shane Stone	3; 6	6; 0	6; 4	4; 6	6; 3
2	(Cuba) (Trinidad and Tobago)	Lázaro Navarro; Ivor Grazette	6; 2	6; 2	6; 4
3	(Cuba) (Trinidad and Tobago)	Sandor Martínez / Lázaro Navarro; Shane Stone / Troy Stone	6; 1	4; 6	6; 3	7; 5
4	(Cuba) (Trinidad and Tobago)	Sandor Martínez; Shane Stone	6; 4	3; 6	6; 4
5	(Cuba) (Trinidad and Tobago)	Yanquiel Medina-Sobrino; Troy Stone	6; 2	2; 0				retired

== Third round ==
=== Uruguay vs. Peru ===
Uruguay
1
Montevideo T.C., Montevideo, Uruguay
12–14 July 2002
Clay

Peru
4

			1	2	3	4	5
1	(Uruguay) (Peru)	Federico Dondo; Iván Miranda	1; 6	3; 6	0; 6
2	(Uruguay) (Peru)	Martín Vilarrubí; Luis Horna	7; 5	5; 7	2; 6	1; 6
3	(Uruguay) (Peru)	Marcel Felder / Martín Vilarrubí; Luis Horna / Iván Miranda	3; 6	6; 4	6; 2	6; 2
4	(Uruguay) (Peru)	Pablo Bianchi; Luis Horna	1; 6	6; 4	1; 6	1; 6
5	(Uruguay) (Peru)	Marcel Felder; Luis Noriega	1; 6	7^{7} 6^{2}	6^{5} 7^{7}
