= 1998 Davis Cup Americas Zone Group III =

Tennis tournament division

The Americas Zone was one of the three zones of the regional Davis Cup competition in 1998.

In the Americas Zone there were four different tiers, called groups, in which teams competed against each other to advance to the upper tier. The top two teams in Group III advanced to the Americas Zone Group II in 1999, whereas the bottom two teams were relegated to the Americas Zone Group IV in 1999.

== Participating nations ==
- Antigua and Barbuda
- Bermuda
- Bolivia
- Costa Rica
- Dominican Republic
- El Salvador
- Panama
- Puerto Rico

=== Draw ===
- Venue: Santa Cruz Tennis Club, Santa Cruz de la Sierra, Bolivia
- Date: 29 April–3 May

Group A

	CRC	BOL	PUR	ATG	RR; W–L	Match; W–L	Set; W–L	Standings
Costa Rica		2–1	3–0	2–1	3–0	7–2 (78%)	14–5 (74%)	1
Bolivia	1–2		3–0	2–1	2–1	6–3 (67%)	13–7 (65%)	2
Puerto Rico	0–3	0–3		2–1	1–2	2–7 (22%)	4–15 (21%)	3
Antigua and Barbuda	1–2	1–2	1–2		0–3	3–6 (33%)	8–12 (40%)	4

Group B

	DOM	ESA	BER	PAN	RR; W–L	Match; W–L	Set; W–L	Standings
Dominican Republic		2–1	2–1	2–1	3–0	6–3 (67%)	12–8 (60%)	1
El Salvador	1–2		2–1	3–0	2–1	6–3 (67%)	13–6 (68%)	2
Bermuda	1–2	1–2		2–1	1–2	4–5 (44%)	10–12 (45%)	3
Panama	1–2	1–2	0–3		0–3	2–7 (22%)	6–15 (29%)	4

1st to 4th place play-offs

3rd-4th Play-off
B2	El Salvador	3
A2	Bolivia	0

Semifinals
A1	Costa Rica	2
B2	El Salvador	1
A2	Bolivia	0
B1	Dominican Republic	2

Final
A1	Costa Rica	1
B1	Dominican Republic	2

5th to 8th place play-offs

7th-8th Play-off
A3	Puerto Rico	2
B3	Bermuda	1

5th-8th Play-offs
A3	Puerto Rico	0
B4	Panama	2
A4	Antigua and Barbuda	2
B3	Bermuda	1

5th-6th Play-off
B4	Panama	2
A4	Antigua and Barbuda	1

=== Final standings ===
Rank	Team
1	Dominican Republic
2	Costa Rica
3	El Salvador
4	Bolivia
5	Panama
6	Antigua and Barbuda
7	Puerto Rico
8	Bermuda

- Dominican Republic and Costa Rica promoted to Group II in 1999.
- Puerto Rico and Bermuda relegated to Group IV in 1999.

== Round robin ==
=== Group A ===
==== Bolivia vs. Antigua and Barbuda ====
Bolivia
2
Santa Cruz Tennis Club, Santa Cruz de la Sierra, Bolivia
29 April 1998

Antigua and Barbuda
1

			1	2	3
1	(Bolivia) (Antigua and Barbuda)	Jorge Rodrigo Villarroel; Jerry Williams	7^{8} 6^{6}	6; 2
2	(Bolivia) (Antigua and Barbuda)	Carlos Martín Navarro Vergara; Phil Williamson	4; 6	3; 6
3	(Bolivia) (Antigua and Barbuda)	Carlos Martín Navarro Vergara / Javier Taborga; Fitzroy Anthony / Phil Williamson	5; 7	6; 4	6; 4

==== Costa Rica vs. Puerto Rico ====
Costa Rica
3
Santa Cruz Tennis Club, Santa Cruz de la Sierra, Bolivia
29 April 1998

Puerto Rico
0

			1	2	3
1	(Costa Rica) (Puerto Rico)	Kenneth Thome Bolanos; Ernie Fernández	7; 5	6; 4
2	(Costa Rica) (Puerto Rico)	Federico Camacho; Luis Haddock	6; 2	6; 4
3	(Costa Rica) (Puerto Rico)	Rafael Ávalos Brenes / Kenneth Thome Bolanos; Ernie Fernández / Edgardo Rivera	6; 3	6; 4

==== Bolivia vs. Costa Rica ====
Bolivia
1
Santa Cruz Tennis Club, Santa Cruz de la Sierra, Bolivia
30 April 1998

Costa Rica
2

			1	2	3
1	(Bolivia) (Costa Rica)	Jorge Rodrigo Villarroel; Rafael Ávalos Brenes	2; 6	4; 6
2	(Bolivia) (Costa Rica)	José Antelo; Federico Camacho	7^{7} 6^{2}	6; 3
3	(Bolivia) (Costa Rica)	Carlos Martín Navarro Vergara / Javier Taborga; Rafael Ávalos Brenes / Kenneth Thome Bolanos	6; 2	1; 6	4; 6

==== Antigua and Barbuda vs. Puerto Rico ====
Antigua and Barbuda
1
Santa Cruz Tennis Club, Santa Cruz de la Sierra, Bolivia
30 April 1998

Puerto Rico
2

			1	2	3
1	(Antigua and Barbuda) (Puerto Rico)	Fitzroy Anthony; Ernie Fernández	2; 6	1; 6
2	(Antigua and Barbuda) (Puerto Rico)	Phil Williamson; Luis Haddock	6; 4	6; 1
3	(Antigua and Barbuda) (Puerto Rico)	Jerry Williams / Phil Williamson; Ernie Fernández / Edgardo Rivera	6; 4	6^{4} 7^{7}	3; 6

==== Bolivia vs. Puerto Rico ====
Bolivia
3
Santa Cruz Tennis Club, Santa Cruz de la Sierra, Bolivia
1 May 1998

Puerto Rico
0

			1	2	3
1	(Bolivia) (Puerto Rico)	José Antelo; Gilberto Rivera	6; 2	7^{7} 6^{5}
2	(Bolivia) (Puerto Rico)	Carlos Martín Navarro Vergara; Luis Haddock	6; 0	6; 1
3	(Bolivia) (Puerto Rico)	Javier Taborga / Jorge Rodrigo Villarroel; Luis Haddock / Edgardo Rivera	6; 3	6; 2

==== Antigua and Barbuda vs. Costa Rica ====
Antigua and Barbuda
1
Santa Cruz Tennis Club, Santa Cruz de la Sierra, Bolivia
1 May 1998

Costa Rica
2

			1	2	3
1	(Antigua and Barbuda) (Costa Rica)	Jerry Williams; Federico Camacho	0; 6	0; 6
2	(Antigua and Barbuda) (Costa Rica)	Phil Williamson; Fabrizio Golfin Guevara	6; 2	6; 2
3	(Antigua and Barbuda) (Costa Rica)	Fitzroy Anthony / Desney Williams; Rafael Ávalos Brenes / Kenneth Thome Bolanos	4; 6	2; 6

=== Group B ===
==== Bermuda vs. El Salvador ====
Bermuda
1
Santa Cruz Tennis Club, Santa Cruz de la Sierra, Bolivia
29 April 1998

El Salvador
2

			1	2	3
1	(Bermuda) (El Salvador)	James Collieson; Miguel Merz	5; 7	3; 6
2	(Bermuda) (El Salvador)	Donald Evans; José Baires	6; 4	5; 7	6; 3
3	(Bermuda) (El Salvador)	Richard Mallory / Michael Way; Yari Bernardo / Miguel Merz	2; 6	4; 6

==== Dominican Republic vs. Panama ====
Dominican Republic
2
Santa Cruz Tennis Club, Santa Cruz de la Sierra, Bolivia
29 April 1998

Panama
1

			1	2	3
1	(Dominican Republic) (Panama)	Sixto Camacho; Chadd Valdes	3; 6	5; 7
2	(Dominican Republic) (Panama)	Rodrigo Vallejo; Carlos Silva	6; 4	6; 4
3	(Dominican Republic) (Panama)	Sixto Camacho / Rodrigo Vallejo; Jan Gelabert / Chadd Valdes	4; 6	6; 3	6; 2

==== Bermuda vs. Dominican Republic ====
Bermuda
1
Santa Cruz Tennis Club, Santa Cruz de la Sierra, Bolivia
30 April 1998

Dominican Republic
2

			1	2	3
1	(Bermuda) (Dominican Republic)	Michael Way; Sixto Camacho	6; 4	1; 6	3; 6
2	(Bermuda) (Dominican Republic)	James Collieson; Rodrigo Vallejo	1; 6	0; 6
3	(Bermuda) (Dominican Republic)	James Collieson / Donald Evans; Víctor Estrella Burgos / Jhonson García	4; 6	6; 3	7; 5

==== El Salvador vs. Panama ====
El Salvador
3
Santa Cruz Tennis Club, Santa Cruz de la Sierra, Bolivia
30 April 1998

Panama
0

			1	2	3
1	(El Salvador) (Panama)	Yari Bernardo; Chadd Valdes	6; 4	6; 3
2	(El Salvador) (Panama)	Miguel Merz; Carlos Silva	7; 5	6; 2
3	(El Salvador) (Panama)	José Baires / Yari Bernardo; Jan Gelabert / Abad Goon	6; 4	6^{2} 7^{7}	8; 6

==== Bermuda vs. Panama ====
Bermuda
2
Santa Cruz Tennis Club, Santa Cruz de la Sierra, Bolivia
1 May 1998

Panama
1

			1	2	3
1	(Bermuda) (Panama)	James Collieson; Carlos Silva	6; 4	0; 6	3; 6
2	(Bermuda) (Panama)	Donald Evans; Abad Goon	6; 3	7^{7} 6^{2}
3	(Bermuda) (Panama)	Richard Mallory / Michael Way; Jan Gelabert / Abad Goon	7; 5	7; 5

==== Dominican Republic vs. El Salvador ====
Dominican Republic
2
Santa Cruz Tennis Club, Santa Cruz de la Sierra, Bolivia
1 May 1998

El Salvador
1

			1	2	3
1	(Dominican Republic) (El Salvador)	Jhonson García; Yari Bernardo	7^{7} 6^{4}	3; 6	6; 8
2	(Dominican Republic) (El Salvador)	Rodrigo Vallejo; Manuel Antonio Tejada Ruiz	6; 2	6; 4
3	(Dominican Republic) (El Salvador)	Sixto Camacho / Rodrigo Vallejo; Miguel Merz / Manuel Antonio Tejada Ruiz	0; 0			retired

== 1st to 4th place play-offs ==
=== Semifinals ===
==== Costa Rica vs. El Salvador ====
Costa Rica
2
Santa Cruz Tennis Club, Santa Cruz de la Sierra, Bolivia
2 May 1998

El Salvador
1

			1	2	3
1	(Costa Rica) (El Salvador)	Rafael Ávalos Brenes; Miguel Merz	4; 6	2; 6
2	(Costa Rica) (El Salvador)	Kenneth Thome Bolanos; José Baires	6; 3	6; 3
3	(Costa Rica) (El Salvador)	Rafael Ávalos Brenes / Kenneth Thome Bolanos; Yari Bernardo / Miguel Merz	7^{7} 6^{4}	6; 2

==== Dominican Republic vs. Bolivia ====
Dominican Republic
2
Santa Cruz Tennis Club, Santa Cruz de la Sierra, Bolivia
2 May 1998

Bolivia
0

			1	2	3
1	(Dominican Republic) (Bolivia)	Jhonson García; José Antelo	2; 6	6; 4	6; 4
2	(Dominican Republic) (Bolivia)	Rodrigo Vallejo; Carlos Martín Navarro Vergara	6; 0	7^{7} 6^{5}
3	(Dominican Republic) (Bolivia)					not played

=== Final ===
==== Dominican Republic vs. Costa Rica ====
Dominican Republic
2
Santa Cruz Tennis Club, Santa Cruz de la Sierra, Bolivia
3 May 1998

Costa Rica
1

			1	2	3
1	(Dominican Republic) (Costa Rica)	Jhonson García; Rafael Ávalos Brenes	7^{7} 6^{3}	6; 3
2	(Dominican Republic) (Costa Rica)	Rodrigo Vallejo; Federico Camacho	6; 2	7; 5
3	(Dominican Republic) (Costa Rica)	Sixto Camacho / Víctor Estrella Burgos; Rafael Ávalos Brenes / Kenneth Thome Bolanos	4; 6	6^{3} 7^{7}

=== 3rd to 4th play-off ===
==== El Salvador vs. Bolivia ====
El Salvador
3
Santa Cruz Tennis Club, Santa Cruz de la Sierra, Bolivia
3 May 1998

Bolivia
0

			1	2	3
1	(El Salvador) (Bolivia)	Yari Bernardo; Javier Taborga	7; 5	6; 4
2	(El Salvador) (Bolivia)	José Baires; Carlos Martín Navarro Vergara	0; 6	6; 3	14; 12
3	(El Salvador) (Bolivia)	José Baires / Miguel Merz; Javier Taborga / Jorge Rodrigo Villarroel	5; 7	6; 2	6; 4

== 5th to 8th place play-offs ==
=== 5th to 8th play-offs ===
==== Panama vs. Puerto Rico ====
Panama
2
Santa Cruz Tennis Club, Santa Cruz de la Sierra, Bolivia
2 May 1998

Puerto Rico
0

			1	2	3
1	(Panama) (Puerto Rico)	Chadd Valdes; Ernie Fernández	6^{6} 7^{8}	6; 2	6; 4
2	(Panama) (Puerto Rico)	Carlos Silva; Edgardo Rivera	6; 0	1; 6	10; 8
3	(Panama) (Puerto Rico)					not played

==== Antigua and Barbuda vs. Bermuda ====
Antigua and Barbuda
2
Santa Cruz Tennis Club, Santa Cruz de la Sierra, Bolivia
2 May 1998

Bermuda
1

			1	2	3
1	(Antigua and Barbuda) (Bermuda)	Jerry Williams; Michael Way	2; 6	6; 4	3; 6
2	(Antigua and Barbuda) (Bermuda)	Phil Williamson; James Collieson	6; 0	6; 3
3	(Antigua and Barbuda) (Bermuda)	Jerry Williams / Phil Williamson; Donald Evans / Richard Mallory	6; 3	6; 4

=== 5th to 6th play-off ===
==== Panama vs. Antigua and Barbuda ====
Panama
2
Santa Cruz Tennis Club, Santa Cruz de la Sierra, Bolivia
3 May 1998

Antigua and Barbuda
1

			1	2	3
1	(Panama) (Antigua and Barbuda)	Chadd Valdes; Jerry Williams	6; 3	6; 0
2	(Panama) (Antigua and Barbuda)	Carlos Silva; Phil Williamson	3; 6	3; 6
3	(Panama) (Antigua and Barbuda)	Abad Goon / Chadd Valdes; Jerry Williams / Phil Williamson	6; 4	6; 4

=== 7th to 8th play-off ===
==== Puerto Rico vs. Bermuda ====
Puerto Rico
2
Santa Cruz Tennis Club, Santa Cruz de la Sierra, Bolivia
3 May 1998

Bermuda
1

			1	2	3
1	(Puerto Rico) (Bermuda)	Gilberto Rivera; James Collieson	7; 5	2; 6	10; 8
2	(Puerto Rico) (Bermuda)	Luis Haddock; Donald Evans	6; 3	7^{7} 6^{1}
3	(Puerto Rico) (Bermuda)	Luis Haddock / Edgardo Rivera; Donald Evans / Richard Mallory	3; 6	7^{8} 6^{6}	1; 6
