= 2001 Davis Cup Americas Zone Group II =

Tennis competition

The Americas Zone was one of the three zones of the regional Davis Cup competition in 2001.

In the Americas Zone there were four different tiers, called groups, in which teams compete against each other to advance to the upper tier. Winners in Group II advanced to the Americas Zone Group I. Teams who lost their respective ties competed in the relegation play-offs, with winning teams remaining in Group II, whereas teams who lost their play-offs were relegated to the Americas Zone Group III in 2002.

== Participating nations ==
- Costa Rica
- Colombia
- Dominican Republic
- Guatemala
- Netherlands Antilles
- Paraguay
- Uruguay
- Venezuela

=== Draw ===
Relegation Play-offs
Bogotá, Colombia (clay)
Colombia	5
Costa Rica	0
Asunción, Paraguay (clay)
Dominican Republic	2
Paraguay	3

First Round
Montevideo, Uruguay (clay)
Colombia	1
Uruguay	3
San Rafael de Escazú, Costa Rica (hard)
Costa Rica	2
Netherlands Antilles	3
Guatemala City, Guatemala (hard)
Dominican Republic	2
Guatemala	3
Asunción, Paraguay (clay)
Paraguay	2
Venezuela	3

Second Round
Montevideo, Uruguay (clay)
Uruguay	5
Netherlands Antilles	0
Guatemala City, Guatemala (hard)
Guatemala	0
Venezuela	5

Third Round
Montevideo, Uruguay (clay)
Uruguay	2
Venezuela	3

- Costa Rica and Dominican Republic relegated to Group III in 2002.
- Venezuela promoted to Group I in 2002.

== First round ==
=== Uruguay vs. Colombia ===
Uruguay
3
Carrasco Lawn Tennis Club, Montevideo, Uruguay
9–11 February 2001
Clay

Colombia
1

			1	2	3	4	5
1	(Uruguay) (Colombia)	Pablo Bianchi; Eduardo Rincón	6; 3	7^{7} 6^{3}	5; 7	1; 6	1; 6
2	(Uruguay) (Colombia)	Federico Dondo; Michael Quintero	6; 3	6; 1	6; 1
3	(Uruguay) (Colombia)	Federico Dondo / Marcelo Filippini; Alejandro Falla / Pablo González	7^{7} 6^{3}	6; 1	4; 6	6; 2
4	(Uruguay) (Colombia)	Pablo Bianchi; Pablo González	6; 1	6; 4	6; 0
5	(Uruguay) (Colombia)	Marcelo Barboza; Alejandro Falla						not played

=== Costa Rica vs. Netherlands Antilles ===
Costa Rica
2
Costa Rica Country Club, San Rafael de Escazú, Costa Rica
9–11 February 2001
Hard

Netherlands Antilles
3

			1	2	3	4	5
1	(Costa Rica) (Netherlands Antilles)	Juan Antonio Marín; Elmar Gerth	6; 0	6; 1	6; 3
2	(Costa Rica) (Netherlands Antilles)	Rafael Ávalos Brenes; Jean-Julien Rojer	4; 6	2; 6	4; 6
3	(Costa Rica) (Netherlands Antilles)	Federico Camacho / Juan Antonio Marín; Elmar Gerth / Jean-Julien Rojer	6; 4	6; 4	3; 6	6^{5} 7^{7}	7; 9
4	(Costa Rica) (Netherlands Antilles)	Juan Antonio Marín; Jean-Julien Rojer	3; 6	6; 4	6^{4} 7^{7}	1; 6
5	(Costa Rica) (Netherlands Antilles)	Rafael Ávalos Brenes; Raoul Behr	6; 0	6; 0

=== Guatemala vs. Dominican Republic ===
Guatemala
3
National Centre, Guatemala City, Guatemala
9–11 February 2001
Hard

Dominican Republic
2

			1	2	3	4	5
1	(Guatemala) (Dominican Republic)	Luis Pérez Chete; Jhonson García	6; 3	6; 3	7^{9} 6^{7}
2	(Guatemala) (Dominican Republic)	Jacobo Chávez; Genaro Deleon	1; 6	7^{7} 6^{5}	6; 4	6; 3
3	(Guatemala) (Dominican Republic)	Jacobo Chávez / Luis Pérez Chete; Sixto Camacho / Víctor Estrella Burgos	7^{7} 6^{3}	6; 4	6; 3
4	(Guatemala) (Dominican Republic)	Walter Barahona; Jhonson García	4; 6	1; 6
5	(Guatemala) (Dominican Republic)	Cristian Paiz; Víctor Estrella Burgos	6^{1} 7^{7}	5; 7

=== Paraguay vs. Venezuela ===
Paraguay
2
Yacht y Golf Club Paraguayo, Asunción, Paraguay
9–11 February 2001
Clay

Venezuela
3

			1	2	3	4	5
1	(Paraguay) (Venezuela)	Ramón Delgado; José de Armas	6; 3	6; 2	6; 1
2	(Paraguay) (Venezuela)	Paulo Carvallo; Jimy Szymanski	2; 6	7^{9} 6^{7}	3; 6	4; 6
3	(Paraguay) (Venezuela)	Paulo Carvallo / Ramón Delgado; José de Armas / Jimy Szymanski	6; 4	2; 6	7^{7} 6^{2}	3; 6	2; 6
4	(Paraguay) (Venezuela)	Ramón Delgado; Jimy Szymanski	4; 6	6; 3	7; 5	6; 2
5	(Paraguay) (Venezuela)	Paulo Carvallo; José de Armas	4; 6	6; 3	3; 6	4; 6

== Second round ==
=== Uruguay vs. Netherlands Antilles ===
Uruguay
5
Montevideo, Uruguay
6–8 April 2001
Clay

Netherlands Antilles
0

			1	2	3	4	5
1	(Uruguay) (Netherlands Antilles)	Pablo Bianchi; Elmar Gerth	6; 3	6; 4	6; 2
2	(Uruguay) (Netherlands Antilles)	Federico Dondo; Jean-Julien Rojer	7^{8} 6^{6}	7^{7} 6^{3}	6; 2
3	(Uruguay) (Netherlands Antilles)	Federico Dondo / Marcelo Filippini; Elmar Gerth / Jean-Julien Rojer	3; 6	6; 0	6; 2	6; 3
4	(Uruguay) (Netherlands Antilles)	Pablo Bianchi; Kevin Jonckheer	6; 2	6; 1
5	(Uruguay) (Netherlands Antilles)	Marcelo Barboza; Raoul Behr	6; 0	6; 2

=== Guatemala vs. Venezuela ===
Guatemala
0
Guatemala City, Guatemala
6–8 April 2001
Hard

Venezuela
5

			1	2	3	4	5
1	(Guatemala) (Venezuela)	Luis Pérez Chete; Jimy Szymanski	3; 6	2; 6	3; 6
2	(Guatemala) (Venezuela)	Jacobo Chávez; José de Armas	4; 6	6; 3	2; 6	6^{7} 7^{9}
3	(Guatemala) (Venezuela)	Jacobo Chávez / Luis Pérez Chete; José de Armas / Jimy Szymanski	3; 6	3; 6	3; 6
4	(Guatemala) (Venezuela)	Rodrigo Gabriel; Jhonnatan Medina-Álvarez	3; 6	6; 4	5; 7
5	(Guatemala) (Venezuela)	Alexander Vásquez; José de Armas	7; 5	3; 6	4; 6

== Relegation play-offs ==
=== Colombia vs. Costa Rica ===
Colombia
5
Bogotá, Colombia
6–8 April 2001
Clay

Costa Rica
0

			1	2	3	4	5
1	(Colombia) (Costa Rica)	Mauricio Hadad; Federico Camacho	6; 0	6; 1	6; 0
2	(Colombia) (Costa Rica)	Miguel Tobón; Juan Antonio Marín	6; 4	7^{7} 6^{5}	4; 6	6; 4
3	(Colombia) (Costa Rica)	Mauricio Hadad / Miguel Tobón; Federico Camacho / Juan Antonio Marín	6; 4	6; 3	6; 3
4	(Colombia) (Costa Rica)	Michael Quintero; Juan Carlos González	6; 2	6; 1
5	(Colombia) (Costa Rica)	Alejandro Falla; Federico Camacho	7^{7} 6^{0}	6; 2

=== Paraguay vs. Dominican Republic ===
Paraguay
3
Asunción, Paraguay
6–8 April 2001
Clay

Dominican Republic
2

			1	2	3	4	5
1	(Paraguay) (Dominican Republic)	Paulo Carvallo; Genaro Deleon	6; 2	7; 5	6; 1
2	(Paraguay) (Dominican Republic)	Ramón Delgado; Rodrigo Vallejo	6; 2	6; 4	6; 0
3	(Paraguay) (Dominican Republic)	Paulo Carvallo / Ramón Delgado; Víctor Estrella Burgos / Rodrigo Vallejo	6; 0	6; 0	6; 1
4	(Paraguay) (Dominican Republic)	Juan Pablo Barboza; Genaro Deleon	2; 6	0; 6
5	(Paraguay) (Dominican Republic)	Juan Enrique Crosa; Víctor Estrella Burgos	6; 3	5; 7	0; 6

== Third round ==
=== Uruguay vs. Venezuela ===
Uruguay
2
Carrasco Lawn Tennis Club, Montevideo, Uruguay
20–22 July 2001
Clay

Venezuela
3

			1	2	3	4	5
1	(Uruguay) (Venezuela)	Federico Dondo; Jimy Szymanski	6^{7} 7^{9}	3; 6	1; 6
2	(Uruguay) (Venezuela)	Pablo Bianchi; José de Armas	6; 3	6; 0	5; 7	3; 6	3; 6
3	(Uruguay) (Venezuela)	Federico Dondo / Marcelo Filippini; José de Armas / Jimy Szymanski	4; 6	3; 6	3; 6
4	(Uruguay) (Venezuela)	Pablo Bianchi; Jhonnatan Medina-Álvarez	6; 0	6; 3
5	(Uruguay) (Venezuela)	Marcelo Barboza; Óscar Posada	6; 4	6; 0
