= 2011 Davis Cup Americas Zone Group II =

International tennis competition

The Americas Zone is one of the three zones of regional Davis Cup competition in 2011.

In the Americas Zone there are four different groups in which teams compete against each other to advance to the next group.

== Participating teams ==
=== Seeds ===
1. Peru
2. Venezuela
3. Dominican Republic
4. Paraguay

=== Other Nations ===
- El Salvador
- Haiti
- Netherlands Antilles
- Puerto Rico

== Draw ==
Play-offs
Santa Tecla, El Salvador (clay)
Netherlands Antilles	2
El Salvador	3
Mayagüez, Puerto Rico (hard)
Puerto Rico	4
Haiti	1

First Round
Lima, Peru (clay)
1	Peru	5
Netherlands Antilles	0
Santa Tecla, El Salvador (clay)
3	Dominican Republic	5
El Salvador	0
Mayagüez, Puerto Rico (hard)
Puerto Rico	1
4	Paraguay	4
Caracas, Venezuela (hard)
Haiti	2
2	Venezuela	3

Second Round
Lima, Peru (clay)
1	Peru	3
3	Dominican Republic	1
Asunción, Paraguay (clay)
4	Paraguay	3
2	Venezuela	1

Third Round
Asunción, Paraguay (clay)
1	Peru	3
4	Paraguay	1

- Netherlands Antilles and Haiti relegated to Group III in 2012.
- Peru promoted to Group I in 2012.

== First round ==
=== Peru vs. Netherlands Antilles ===
Peru
5
Club Lawn Tennis de la Exposicion, Lima, Peru
4–6 March 2011
clay (outdoor)

Netherlands Antilles
0

			1	2	3	4	5
1	(Peru) (Netherlands Antilles)	Iván Miranda; David Josepa	6; 0	6; 0	6; 1
2	(Peru) (Netherlands Antilles)	Mauricio Echazú; Alexander Blom	6; 2	6; 3	7; 5
3	(Peru) (Netherlands Antilles)	Duilio Beretta / Sergio Galdós; Alexander Blom / Martijn van Haasteren	6; 4	6; 2	3; 6	6; 2
4	(Peru) (Netherlands Antilles)	Sergio Galdós; David Josepa	6; 2	6; 2
5	(Peru) (Netherlands Antilles)	Duilio Beretta; Nick Van Rosberg	6; 0	6; 0

=== El Salvador vs. Dominican Republic ===
El Salvador
0
Maya Country Club, Santa Tecla, El Salvador
4–6 March 2011
clay (outdoor)

Dominican Republic
5

			1	2	3	4	5
1	(El Salvador) (Dominican Republic)	Marcelo Arévalo; Jhonson García	3; 6	3; 6	1; 6
2	(El Salvador) (Dominican Republic)	Rafael Arévalo; Víctor Estrella	6; 2	6^{3} 7^{7}	4; 6	1; 6
3	(El Salvador) (Dominican Republic)	Marcelo Arévalo / Rafael Arévalo; Víctor Estrella / José Hernández	4; 6	4; 6	6; 4	4; 6
4	(El Salvador) (Dominican Republic)	Andrés Weisskopf; Luis Delgado	4; 6	2; 6
5	(El Salvador) (Dominican Republic)	Alberto Emmanuel Alvarado Larin; Jhonson García	0; 6	1; 6

=== Puerto Rico vs. Paraguay ===
Puerto Rico
1
RUM Tennis Courts, Mayagüez, Puerto Rico
4–6 March 2011
hard (outdoor)

Paraguay
4

			1	2	3	4	5
1	(Puerto Rico) (Paraguay)	Ricardo González-Díaz; Daniel-Alejandro López	2; 6	2; 6	4; 6
2	(Puerto Rico) (Paraguay)	Alex Llompart; Diego Galeano	6; 3	3; 6	4; 6	7; 5	6; 1
3	(Puerto Rico) (Paraguay)	Chris Brandi / Alex Llompart; Daniel-Alejandro López / Gustavo Ramirez	6; 4	3; 6	1; 6	6; 4	5; 7
4	(Puerto Rico) (Paraguay)	Alex Llompart; Daniel-Alejandro López	3; 6	0; 6	4; 6
5	(Puerto Rico) (Paraguay)	Chris Brandi; Diego Galeano	4; 6	3; 6

=== Venezuela vs. Haiti ===
Venezuela
3
Centro Nacional de Tenis, Caracas, Venezuela
4–6 March 2011
hard (outdoor)

Haiti
2

			1	2	3	4	5
1	(Venezuela) (Haiti)	Luis David Martínez; Olivier Sajous	6^{2} 7^{7}	3; 6	6; 3	4; 6
2	(Venezuela) (Haiti)	Piero Luisi; Jean Marc Bazanne	6; 2	6; 2	6; 1
3	(Venezuela) (Haiti)	Piero Luisi / Roberto Maytín; Joel Allen / Olivier Sajous	6^{3} 7^{7}	3; 6	7^{7} 6^{0}	6; 2	6; 2
4	(Venezuela) (Haiti)	Piero Luisi; Olivier Sajous	7^{7} 6^{3}	4; 6	4; 6	6; 0	4; 6
5	(Venezuela) (Haiti)	Román Recarte; Jean Marc Bazanne	6; 3	6; 1	6; 2

== Playoff round ==
=== El Salvador vs. Netherlands Antilles ===
El Salvador
3
Maya Country Club, Santa Tecla, El Salvador
8–10 July 2011
clay (outdoor)

Netherlands Antilles
2

			1	2	3	4	5
1	(El Salvador) (Netherlands Antilles)	Rafael Arévalo; Alexander Blom	6; 4	1; 6	2; 6	5; 7
2	(El Salvador) (Netherlands Antilles)	Marcelo Arévalo; Martijn van Haasteren	6; 1	5; 7	6; 2	7^{7} 6^{4}
3	(El Salvador) (Netherlands Antilles)	Marcelo Arévalo / Rafael Arévalo; Alexander Blom / Martijn van Haasteren	6; 3	6; 2	6; 3
4	(El Salvador) (Netherlands Antilles)	Marcelo Arévalo; Alexander Blom	4; 6	4; 6	6; 3	6; 3	3; 6
5	(El Salvador) (Netherlands Antilles)	Rafael Arévalo; Martijn van Haasteren	6; 4	6; 2	6; 1

=== Puerto Rico vs. Haiti ===
Puerto Rico
4
Recinto Universitario de Mayaguez, Mayagüez, Puerto Rico
8–10 July 2011
hard (outdoor)

Haiti
1

			1	2	3	4	5
1	(Puerto Rico) (Haiti)	Chris Brandi; Gonzales Austin	6; 3	6; 4	6; 1
2	(Puerto Rico) (Haiti)	Gabriel Flores Ruiz; Olivier Sajous	6; 4	4; 6	6; 1	6; 4
3	(Puerto Rico) (Haiti)	Gilberto Álvarez / Álex Llompart; Joel Allen / Olivier Sajous	6; 4	6; 2	6; 4
4	(Puerto Rico) (Haiti)	Chris Brandi; Johann Coles	6; 4	6; 3
5	(Puerto Rico) (Haiti)	Gabriel Flores Ruiz; Gonzales Austin	6^{6} 7^{8}	6^{5} 7^{7}

== Second round ==
=== Peru vs. Dominican Republic ===
Peru
3
Club Lawn Tennis de la Exposicion, Lima, Peru
8–10 July 2011
clay (outdoor)

Dominican Republic
1

			1	2	3	4	5
1	(Peru) (Dominican Republic)	Duilio Beretta; Jhonson García	6; 3	6; 4	7; 5
2	(Peru) (Dominican Republic)	Iván Miranda; Víctor Estrella	4; 6	5; 7	6; 1	4; 6
3	(Peru) (Dominican Republic)	Duilio Beretta / Sergio Galdós; Víctor Estrella / Jhonson García	6; 4	6^{6} 7^{8}	6; 4	6; 3
4	(Peru) (Dominican Republic)	Duilio Beretta; Víctor Estrella	7; 5	6; 3	6^{4} 7^{7}	6; 4
5	(Peru) (Dominican Republic)	Iván Miranda; Jhonson García						not played

=== Venezuela vs. Paraguay ===
Paraguay
3
Club Internacional de Tenis CIT, Asunción, Paraguay
8–10 July 2011
clay (outdoor)

Venezuela
1

			1	2	3	4	5
1	(Paraguay) (Venezuela)	Diego Galeano; Román Recarte	6; 4	7^{7} 6^{3}	6; 3
2	(Paraguay) (Venezuela)	Daniel-Alejandro López; David Souto	6^{4} 7^{7}	5; 7	4; 6
3	(Paraguay) (Venezuela)	Daniel-Alejandro López / Gustavo Ramírez; Piero Luisi / Robert Maytin	4; 6	6; 4	7; 5	6; 2
4	(Paraguay) (Venezuela)	Diego Galeano; David Souto	4; 6	6; 3	6; 4	6; 4
5	(Paraguay) (Venezuela)	Daniel-Alejandro López; Román Recarte						not played

== Third round ==
=== Peru vs. Paraguay ===
Peru
3
Club Internacional de tenis - CIT, Asunción, Paraguay
16–19 September 2011
clay (outdoor)

Paraguay
1

			1	2	3	4	5
1	(Peru) (Paraguay)	Mauricio Echazú; Daniel-Alejandro López	7^{7} 6^{1}	7; 5	6; 3
2	(Peru) (Paraguay)	Duilio Beretta; Diego Galeano	6; 1	4; 6	4; 6	4; 6
3	(Peru) (Paraguay)	Duilio Beretta / Sergio Galdós; Diego Galeano / Gustavo Ramírez	7^{7} 6^{5}	4; 6	6; 2	7^{7} 6^{5}
4	(Peru) (Paraguay)	Duilio Beretta; Daniel-Alejandro López	6; 0	7^{8} 6^{6}	6; 3
5	(Peru) (Paraguay)	Mauricio Echazú; Diego Galeano
