= Netherlands Antilles Davis Cup team =

Netherlands Antilles
- First year: 1998
- Years played: 14
- Ties played (W–L): 41 (26–15)
- Most total wins: Jean-Julien Rojer (40–9)
- Most singles wins: Jean-Julien Rojer (28–6)
- Most doubles wins: Jean-Julien Rojer (12–3)
- Best doubles team: Elmar Gerth / Kevin Jonckheer; Raoul Behr / Jean-Julien Rojer (7–1)
- Most ties played: Jean-Julien Rojer (29)
- Most years played: Raoul Behr, Jean-Julien Rojer (10)

The Netherlands Antilles Davis Cup team represented the Netherlands Antilles in Davis Cup tennis competition and were governed by the Netherlands Antilles Tennis Association until one year after their dissolution.

== History ==
The Netherlands Antilles competed in its first Davis Cup in 1998.

The Netherlands Antilles qualified to compete in the Americas Zone of Group III in 2012, after being beaten by El Salvador in the Play-offs of Group II 2011, but did not enroll this year. They reached the semifinals of Group II on three occasions.

== Players ==
Player	W-L (Total)	W-L (Singles)	W-L (Doubles)	Ties	Debut	Ref
Raoul Behr	10–14	0–8	10–6	22	1998	
Alexander Blom	8–15	7–10	1–5	11	2005	
Piet Hein Boekel	1–7	1–4	0–3	6	2002	
Claudio Dias Conduto	0–1	0–1	0–0	1	2010	
Jason Engelhardt	0–1	0–1	0–0	1	2008	
Elmar Gerth	22–14	11–10	11–4	22	1998	
Kevin Jonckheer	12–6	1–2	11–4	17	1998	
David Josepa	0–4	0–4	0–0	3	2005	
Gino Meeuwsen	0–1	0–1	0–0	1	2010	
(Netherlands) Jean-Julien Rojer	40–9	28–6	12–3	29	1998	
Romano Tatuhey	5–3	3–1	2–2	4	2008	
Leroy Tujeehut	0–1	0–1	0–0	1	2003	
Martijn van Haasteren	6–8	0–1	0–0	7	2008	
Nick van Rosberg	1–6	1–5	0–1	6	2007	
Rasid Winklaar	2–7	2–7	0–0	7	2004	

== Recent performances ==
^{(i)} = Played on an indoor court

=== 1990s ===
Year	Competition	Date	Surface	Venue	Opponent	Score	Result
1998	Americas Zone Group IV, Round Robin	23–29 March	N/A	St. Lucia Racquet Club, Gros Islet (LCA)	Eastern Caribbean	3–0	Win
1998	Americas Zone Group IV, Round Robin	23–29 March	N/A	St. Lucia Racquet Club, Gros Islet (LCA)	U.S. Virgin Islands	3–0	Win
1998	Americas Zone Group IV, Round Robin	23–29 March	N/A	St. Lucia Racquet Club, Gros Islet (LCA)	Barbados	3–0	Win
1998	Americas Zone Group IV, Round Robin	23–29 March	N/A	St. Lucia Racquet Club, Gros Islet (LCA)	Trinidad and Tobago	3–0	Win
1998	Americas Zone Group IV, Round Robin	23–29 March	N/A	St. Lucia Racquet Club, Gros Islet (LCA)	Honduras	2–1	Win
1998	Americas Zone Group IV, Round Robin	23–29 March	N/A	St. Lucia Racquet Club, Gros Islet (LCA)	Saint Lucia	2–1	Win
1999	Americas Zone Group III, Group A	3–7 May	N/A	Fredo Maduro Centre, Panama City (PAN)	El Salvador	2–1	Win
1999	Americas Zone Group III, Group A	3–7 May	N/A	Fredo Maduro Centre, Panama City (PAN)	Guatemala	1–2	Loss
1999	Americas Zone Group III, Group A	3–7 May	N/A	Fredo Maduro Centre, Panama City (PAN)	Antigua and Barbuda	2–1	Win
1999	Americas Zone Group III, 5th to 6th play-offs Semifinals	3–7 May	N/A	Fredo Maduro Centre, Panama City (PAN)	Honduras	2–1	Win
1999	Americas Zone Group III, 5th to 6th play-offs Finals	3–7 May	N/A	Fredo Maduro Centre, Panama City (PAN)	Jamaica	2–1	Win

=== 2000s ===
Year	Competition	Date	Surface	Venue	Opponent	Score	Result
2000	Americas Zone Group III, Group B	22–26 March	N/A	Liguanea Club, Kingston (JAM)	Bolivia	3–0	Win
2000	Americas Zone Group III, Group B	22–26 March	N/A	Liguanea Club, Kingston (JAM)	Trinidad and Tobago	3–0	Win
2000	Americas Zone Group III, Group B	22–26 March	N/A	Liguanea Club, Kingston (JAM)	Dominican Republic	2–1	Win
2000	Americas Zone Group III, 1st to 4th play-offs Semifinals	22–26 March	N/A	Liguanea Club, Kingston (JAM)	Jamaica	2–1	Win
2000	Americas Zone Group III, 1st to 4th play-offs Final	22–26 March	N/A	Liguanea Club, Kingston (JAM)	Dominican Republic	2–1	Win
2001	Americas Zone Group II, First round	9–11 February	Hard	Costa Rica Country Club, San Rafael de Escazú (CRC)	Costa Rica	3–2	Win
2001	Americas Zone Group II, Second round	6–8 April	Clay	Montevideo (URU)	Uruguay	0–5	Loss
2002	Americas Zone Group II, First round	8–10 February	Clay	Asunción (PAR)	Paraguay	0–5	Loss
2002	Americas Zone Group II, Play-offs	5–7 April	Hard	National Centre, Guatemala City (GUA)	Guatemala	3–2	Win
2003	Americas Zone Group II, First round	7–9 February	Carpet (i)	Instituto del Deporte del Estado de Aguascalientes, Aguascalientes (MEX)	Mexico	0–5	Loss
2003	Americas Zone Group II, Play-offs	4–6 April	Hard	Santa Catharina Sport & Country Club, Willemstad (AHO)	Haiti	2–3	Loss
2004	Americas Zone Group III, Pool B	4–7 February	Hard	Country Club de Tegucigalpa, Tegucigalpa (HON)	Trinidad and Tobago	2–1	Win
2004	Americas Zone Group III, Pool B	4–7 February	Hard	Country Club de Tegucigalpa, Tegucigalpa (HON)	U.S. Virgin Islands	3–0	Win
2004	Americas Zone Group III, Pool B	4–7 February	Hard	Country Club de Tegucigalpa, Tegucigalpa (HON)	El Salvador	2–1	Win
2004	Americas Zone Group III, 1st to 4th play-offs Semifinals	4–7 February	Hard	Country Club de Tegucigalpa, Tegucigalpa (HON)	Colombia	0–3	Loss
2004	Americas Zone Group III, 1st to 4th play-offs Final	4–7 February	Hard	Country Club de Tegucigalpa, Tegucigalpa (HON)	Bolivia	3–0	Win
2005	Americas Zone Group II, First round	4–6 March	Clay	Sta Catharina Sport & Country Club, Curaçao (AHO)	Bahamas	3–2	Win
2005	Americas Zone Group II, Second round	15–17 July	Clay (i)	Complexo Centreventos Cau Hansen, Caterina (BRA)	Brazil	0–5	Loss
2006	Americas Zone Group II, First round	10–12 February	Hard	Sport & Ontspannings Vereniging Asiento, Emmastad (AHO)	Guatemala	3–2	Win
2006	Americas Zone Group II, Second round	7–9 April	Hard	Sport & Ontspannings Vereniging Asiento, Emmastad (AHO)	Dominican Republic	2–3	Loss
2007	Americas Zone Group II, First round	9–11 February	Clay	Guayaquil Tenis Club, Guayaquil (ECU)	Ecuador	0–5	Loss
2007	Americas Zone Group II, Play-offs	6–8 April	Hard	The Eric Ball Tennis Centre, Kingston (JAM)	Jamaica	5–0	Win
2008	Americas Zone Group II, First round	8–10 February	Hard	Sport & Ontspannings Vereniging Asiento, Emmastad (AHO)	Ecuador	1–4	Loss
2008	Americas Zone Group II, Play-offs	11–13 April	Hard	Sport & Ontspannings Vereniging Asiento, Emmastad (AHO)	Bolivia	3–2	Win
2009	Americas Zone Group II, First round	6–8 March	Hard	Complejo Bolivariano de Tenis, Barquisimeto (VEN)	Venezuela	1–4	Loss
2009	Americas Zone Group II, Play-offs	10–12 July	Hard	Sport & Ontspannings Vereniging Asiento, Emmastad (AHO)	Jamaica	5–0	Win

=== 2010s ===
Year	Competition	Date	Surface	Venue	Opponent	Score	Result
2010	Americas Zone Group II, First round	5–7 March	Clay	Yacht y Golf Club Paraguayo, Lambaré (PAR)	Paraguay	1–4	Loss
2010	Americas Zone Group II, Play-offs	9–11 July	Hard	Federacion Nacional de Tenis, Guatemala City (GUA)	Guatemala	3–2	Win
2011	Americas Zone Group II, First round	4–6 March	Clay	Club Lawn Tennis de la Exposicion, Lima (PER)	Peru	0–5	Loss
2011	Americas Zone Group II, Play-offs	8–10 July	Clay	Maya Country Club, Santa Tecla (ESA)	El Salvador	2–3	Loss

== See also ==
- Davis Cup
