= 2009 Davis Cup Americas Zone Group II =

International tennis competition

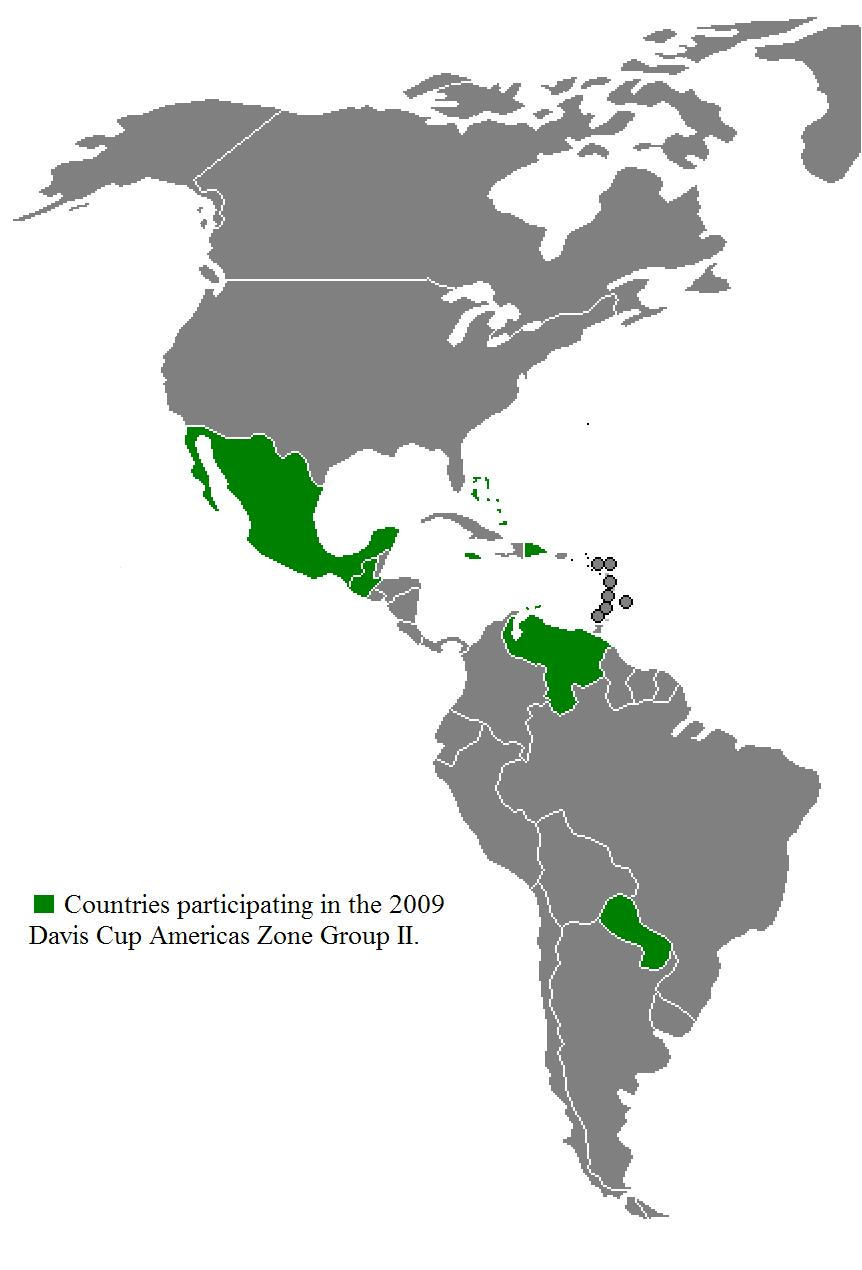
Countries participating in the 2009 Davis Cup Americas Zone Group II

The Americas Zone is one of the three zones of regional Davis Cup competition in 2009.

In the Americas Zone there are four different groups in which teams compete against each other to advance to the next group.

== Participating teams ==
- Bahamas
- Dominican Republic
- Guatemala
- Jamaica
- Mexico
- Netherlands Antilles
- Paraguay
- Venezuela

== Draw ==
Play-offs
Jamaica	0
Netherlands Antilles	5
Guatemala	3
Bahamas	2

First Round
Mexico City, Mexico
1	Mexico	5
Jamaica	0
Barquisimeto, Venezuela
3	Venezuela	4
Netherlands Antilles	1
Santo Domingo, Dominican Republic
Guatemala	0
4	Dominican Republic	5
Lambare, Paraguay
Bahamas	1
2	Paraguay	4

Second Round
1	Mexico	2
3	Venezuela	3
4	Dominican Republic	3
2	Paraguay	2

Third Round
3	Venezuela	2
4	Dominican Republic	3

- Jamaica and Bahamas relegated to Group III in 2010.
- Dominican Republic promoted to Group I in 2010.

== First round matches ==
=== Mexico vs. Jamaica ===
Mexico
5
Rafael "Pelon" Osuna, Mexico City, Mexico
6–8 March 2009
clay (outdoors)

Jamaica
0

			1	2	3	4	5
1	(Mexico) (Jamaica)	Bruno Echagaray; Damar Johnson	6; 2	6; 1	6; 2
2	(Mexico) (Jamaica)	Santiago González; Damion Johnson	6; 4	6; 2	6; 0
3	(Mexico) (Jamaica)	Luis-Manuel Flores / Santiago González; Damar Johnson / Damion Johnson	6; 3	6; 1	6; 1
4	(Mexico) (Jamaica)	Miguel Gallardo-Valles; Christopher Lawson	6; 0	6; 3
5	(Mexico) (Jamaica)	Bruno Echagaray; Brandon Burke	6; 2	6; 0

=== Venezuela vs. Netherlands Antilles ===
Venezuela
4
Complejo Bolivariano de Tenis, Barquisimeto, Venezuela
6–8 March 2009
hard (outdoors)

Netherlands Antilles
1

			1	2	3	4	5
1	(Venezuela) (Netherlands Antilles)	Piero Luisi; Martijn van Haasteren	7; 5	6; 2	6; 4
2	(Venezuela) (Netherlands Antilles)	José de Armas; Romano Tatuhey	3; 6	6; 2	6; 3	6; 4
3	(Venezuela) (Netherlands Antilles)	José de Armas / Yohny Romero; Romano Tatuhey / Martijn van Haasteren	6; 3	6; 3	7^{10} 6^{8}
4	(Venezuela) (Netherlands Antilles)	Luis David Martinez; Martijn van Haasteren	3; 6	3; 6
5	(Venezuela) (Netherlands Antilles)	Piero Luisi; Nick Van Rosberg	6; 3	6; 1

=== Guatemala vs. Dominican Republic ===
Guatemala
0
Santo Domingo Tennis Club Inc, Santo Domingo, Dominican Republic
6–8 March 2009
clay (outdoors)

Dominican Republic
5

			1	2	3	4	5
1	(Guatemala) (Dominican Republic)	Christopher Diaz-Figueroa; Jhonson García	4; 6	2; 6	0; 6
2	(Guatemala) (Dominican Republic)	Julen Urigüen; Víctor Estrella	6; 3	2; 6	3; 4			retired
3	(Guatemala) (Dominican Republic)	Cristian Piaz / Christian Saravia; Víctor Estrella / Jhonson García	1; 6	5; 7	4; 6
4	(Guatemala) (Dominican Republic)	Christopher Diaz-Figueroa; José Hernández	6; 3	0; 6	3; 6
5	(Guatemala) (Dominican Republic)	Christian Saravia; Jesus Francisco Felix	1; 6	4; 6

=== Bahamas vs. Paraguay ===
Bahamas
1
Court Central del Yacht y Golf Club Paraguayo, Lambaré, Paraguay
6–8 March 2009
clay (outdoors)

Paraguay
4

			1	2	3	4	5
1	(The Bahamas) (Paraguay)	Timothy Neilly; Ramón Delgado	1; 6	4; 6	2; 6
2	(The Bahamas) (Paraguay)	Devin Mullings; Diego Galeano	4; 6	7; 5	4; 1
3	(The Bahamas) (Paraguay)	Bjorn Munroe / Marvin Rolle; Ramón Delgado / Diego Galeano	1; 6	0; 6	2; 6
4	(The Bahamas) (Paraguay)	Devin Mullings; Ramón Delgado	1; 6	6^{3} 7^{7}	1; 6
5	(The Bahamas) (Paraguay)	Timothy Neilly; Diego Galeano	4; 6	1; 6

== Second round matches ==
=== Venezuela vs. Mexico ===
Venezuela
3
Complejo de Tenis Vereda del Lago, Maracaibo, Venezuela
10–12 July 2009
hard (outdoors)

Mexico
2

			1	2	3	4	5
1	(Venezuela) (Mexico)	Daniel Vallverdu; César Ramírez	6; 3	6; 2	6; 2
2	(Venezuela) (Mexico)	José de Armas; Miguel Gallardo-Valles	6; 3	6; 2	6; 2
3	(Venezuela) (Mexico)	José de Armas / Piero Luisi; Santiago González / Luis Manuel Flores	6^{8} 7^{10}	6; 3	6; 4	7; 5
4	(Venezuela) (Mexico)	Jhonnatan Medina-Álvarez; César Ramírez	1; 6	0; 1				retired
5	(Venezuela) (Mexico)	Piero Luisi; Luis Manuel Flores	6; 4	3; 6	3; 6

=== Dominican Republic vs. Paraguay ===
Dominican Republic
3
San Diego Campo Club, Inc, San Francisco de Macorís, Dominican Republic
10–12 July 2009
clay (outdoors)

Paraguay
2

			1	2	3	4	5
1	(Dominican Republic) (Paraguay)	José Hernández; Diego Galeano	6; 0	6; 1	6; 2
2	(Dominican Republic) (Paraguay)	Víctor Estrella; Nicolas Salama	6; 1	6; 0	2; 0			retired
3	(Dominican Republic) (Paraguay)	Víctor Estrella / José Hernández; José Benítez / Diego Galeano	6; 2	6; 2	6; 2
4	(Dominican Republic) (Paraguay)	Jesus Francisco Felix; Diego Galeano	6; 3	1; 6	1; 6
5	(Dominican Republic) (Paraguay)	Amaury Gomez; José Benítez	4; 6	6^{7} 7^{9}

== First round play-off matches ==
=== Jamaica vs. Netherlands Antilles ===
Jamaica
0
S.O.V. Asiento, Curaçao
10–12 July 2009
hard (outdoors)

Netherlands Antilles
5

			1	2	3	4	5
1	(Jamaica) (Netherlands Antilles)	Christopher Lawson; Alexander Blom	6; 4	2; 6	2; 4			retired
2	(Jamaica) (Netherlands Antilles)	Dominic Pagon; Romano Tatuhey	1; 6	3; 6	4; 6
3	(Jamaica) (Netherlands Antilles)	Dominic Pagon / Tyler Chin; Romano Tatuhey / Martijn van Haasteren	1; 6	1; 6	4; 6
4	(Jamaica) (Netherlands Antilles)	Tyler Chin; Alexander Blom	2; 6	1; 6
5	(Jamaica) (Netherlands Antilles)	Christopher Lawson; Martijn van Haasteren	4; 6	2; 6

=== Guatemala vs. Bahamas ===
Guatemala
3
National Tennis Center, Nassau, Bahamas
10–12 July 2009
hard (outdoors)

Bahamas
2

			1	2	3	4	5
1	(Guatemala) (The Bahamas)	Julen Uriguen; Devin Mullings	3; 6	4; 6	2; 6
2	(Guatemala) (The Bahamas)	Christopher Diaz-Figueroa; Timothy Neilly	7; 5	6; 1	6; 2
3	(Guatemala) (The Bahamas)	Christopher Diaz-Figueroa / Sebastien Vidal; Devin Mullings / Marvin Rolle	7^{7} 6^{5}	7; 5	4; 6	3; 6	8; 6
4	(Guatemala) (The Bahamas)	Christopher Diaz-Figueroa; Devin Mullings	5; 7	6; 3	1; 6	1; 6
5	(Guatemala) (The Bahamas)	Julen Uriguen; Marvin Rolle	6^{5} 7^{7}	6; 4	4; 6	6; 2	8; 6

== Third round matches ==
=== Dominican Republic vs. Venezuela ===
Dominican Republic
3
Santo Domingo Tennis Club, Santo Domingo, Dominican Republic
18–20 September 2009
clay (outdoors)

Venezuela
2

			1	2	3	4	5
1	(Dominican Republic) (Venezuela)	Víctor Estrella; Daniel Vallverdu	6; 4	6; 3	4; 6	7; 5
2	(Dominican Republic) (Venezuela)	José Hernández; José de Armas	3; 6	1; 6	6; 3	1; 6
3	(Dominican Republic) (Venezuela)	Víctor Estrella / Jhonson García; José de Armas / Daniel Vallverdu	4; 6	6^{6} 7^{8}	1; 6
4	(Dominican Republic) (Venezuela)	Víctor Estrella; José de Armas	6; 3	2; 6	7^{8} 6^{6}	3; 6	6; 1
5	(Dominican Republic) (Venezuela)	Jhonson García; Daniel Vallverdu	6; 3	6; 3	7; 5
