= 1999 Davis Cup Americas Zone Group III =

International tennis competition

The Americas Zone was one of the three zones of the regional Davis Cup competition in 1999.

In the Americas Zone there were four different tiers, called groups, in which teams competed against each other to advance to the upper tier. The top two teams in Group III advanced to the Americas Zone Group II in 2000, whereas the bottom two teams were relegated to the Americas Zone Group IV in 2000.

== Participating nations ==
- Antigua and Barbuda
- Bolivia
- El Salvador
- Guatemala
- Honduras
- Jamaica
- Netherlands Antilles
- Panama

=== Draw ===
- Venue: Fredo Maduro Centre, Panama City, Panama
- Date: 3–7 May

Group A

	GUA	ESA	AHO	ATG	RR; W–L	Match; W–L	Set; W–L	Standings
Guatemala		2–1	2–1	3–0	3–0	7–2 (78%)	14–6 (70%)	1
El Salvador	1–2		2–1	3–0	2–1	6–3 (67%)	14–9 (61%)	2
Netherlands Antilles	1–2	1–2		2–1	1–2	4–5 (44%)	12–11 (52%)	3
Antigua and Barbuda	0–3	0–3	1–2		0–3	1–8 (11%)	3–17 (15%)	4

Group B

	PAN	BOL	JAM	HON	RR; W–L	Match; W–L	Set; W–L	Standings
Panama		2–1	3–0	2–1	3–0	7–2 (78%)	15–6 (71%)	1
Bolivia	1–2		2–1	3–0	2–1	6–3 (67%)	13–8 (62%)	2
Jamaica	0–3	1–2		2–1	1–2	3–6 (33%)	8–15 (35%)	3
Honduras	1–2	0–3	1–2		0–3	2–7 (22%)	8–15 (35%)	4

1st to 4th place play-offs

3rd-4th Play-off
B2	Bolivia	0
B1	Panama	3

Semifinals
A1	Guatemala	2
B2	Bolivia	1
A2	El Salvador	2
B1	Panama	1

Final
A1	Guatemala	1
A2	El Salvador	2

5th to 8th place play-offs

7th-8th Play-off
B4	Honduras	1
A4	Antigua and Barbuda	2

5th-8th Play-offs
A3	Netherlands Antilles	2
B4	Honduras	1
A4	Antigua and Barbuda	0
B3	Jamaica	3

5th-6th Play-off
A3	Netherlands Antilles	2
B3	Jamaica	1

=== Final standings ===
Rank	Team
1	El Salvador
2	Guatemala
3	Panama
4	Bolivia
5	Netherlands Antilles
6	Jamaica
7	Antigua and Barbuda
8	Honduras

- El Salvador and Guatemala promoted to Group II in 2000.
- Antigua and Barbuda and Honduras relegated to Group IV in 2000.

== Round robin ==
=== Group A ===
==== Netherlands Antilles vs. El Salvador ====
Netherlands Antilles
1
Fredo Maduro Centre, Panama City, Panama
3 May 1999

El Salvador
2

			1	2	3
1	(Netherlands Antilles) (El Salvador)	Jean-Julien Rojer; Yari Bernardo	6; 4	4; 6	6; 8
2	(Netherlands Antilles) (El Salvador)	Elmar Gerth; Manuel Antonio Tejada Ruiz	6^{5} 7^{7}	6; 1	4; 6
3	(Netherlands Antilles) (El Salvador)	Elmar Gerth / Kevin Jonckheer; José Baires / Augusto Sanabria	6; 3	2; 6	6; 2

==== Antigua and Barbuda vs. Guatemala ====
Antigua and Barbuda
0
Fredo Maduro Centre, Panama City, Panama
3 May 1999

Guatemala
3

			1	2	3
1	(Antigua and Barbuda) (Guatemala)	Jerry Williams; Alexander Lehnhoff	0; 6	2; 6
2	(Antigua and Barbuda) (Guatemala)	Phil Williamson; Jacobo Chávez	3; 6	3; 6
3	(Antigua and Barbuda) (Guatemala)	Carlton Bedminster / Fernando Peters; Daniel Chávez Morales / Alexander Lehnhoff	1; 6	4; 6

==== Netherlands Antilles vs. Guatemala ====
Netherlands Antilles
1
Fredo Maduro Centre, Panama City, Panama
4 May 1999

Guatemala
2

			1	2	3
1	(Netherlands Antilles) (Guatemala)	Jean-Julien Rojer; Alexander Lehnhoff	7; 5	6; 4
2	(Netherlands Antilles) (Guatemala)	Elmar Gerth; Jacobo Chávez	1; 6	5; 7
3	(Netherlands Antilles) (Guatemala)	Elmar Gerth / Kevin Jonckheer; Daniel Chávez Morales / Jacobo Chávez	2; 6	6; 3	3; 6

==== Antigua and Barbuda vs. El Salvador ====
Antigua and Barbuda
0
Fredo Maduro Centre, Panama City, Panama
4 May 1999

El Salvador
3

			1	2	3
1	(Antigua and Barbuda) (El Salvador)	Carlton Bedminster; Yari Bernardo	0; 6	3; 6
2	(Antigua and Barbuda) (El Salvador)	Phil Williamson; Manuel Antonio Tejada Ruiz	7^{7} 6^{2}	3; 6	4; 6
3	(Antigua and Barbuda) (El Salvador)	Fernando Peters / Jerry Williams; José Baires / Augusto Sanabria	6^{5} 7^{7}	3; 6

==== Netherlands Antilles vs. Antigua and Barbuda ====
Netherlands Antilles
2
Fredo Maduro Centre, Panama City, Panama
5 May 1999

Antigua and Barbuda
1

			1	2	3
1	(Netherlands Antilles) (Antigua and Barbuda)	Kevin Jonckheer; Carlton Bedminster	6; 4	6; 2
2	(Netherlands Antilles) (Antigua and Barbuda)	Jean-Julien Rojer; Phil Williamson	6; 2	2; 6	4; 6
3	(Netherlands Antilles) (Antigua and Barbuda)	Elmar Gerth / Kevin Jonckheer; Carlton Bedminster / Phil Williamson	6; 3	6; 1

==== El Salvador vs. Guatemala ====
El Salvador
1
Fredo Maduro Centre, Panama City, Panama
5 May 1999

Guatemala
2

			1	2	3
1	(El Salvador) (Guatemala)	Augusto Sanabria; Luis Valencia	3; 6	4; 6
2	(El Salvador) (Guatemala)	José Baires; Alexander Lehnhoff	6; 2	6; 4
3	(El Salvador) (Guatemala)	José Baires / Augusto Sanabria; Daniel Chávez Morales / Jacobo Chávez	6; 1	4; 6	2; 6

=== Group B ===
==== Panama vs. Honduras ====
Panama
2
Fredo Maduro Centre, Panama City, Panama
3 May 1999

Honduras
1

			1	2	3
1	(Panama) (Honduras)	Juan Pablo Herrera; Calton Álvarez	2; 6	6; 3	6; 0
2	(Panama) (Honduras)	Chadd Valdes; Carlos Cáceres	6; 2	5; 7	0; 6
3	(Panama) (Honduras)	Juan Pablo Herrera / Carlos Silva; Calton Álvarez / Carlos Cáceres	6; 3	6; 0

==== Bolivia vs. Jamaica ====
Bolivia
2
Fredo Maduro Centre, Panama City, Panama
3 May 1999

Jamaica
1

			1	2	3
1	(Bolivia) (Jamaica)	Javier Taborga; Karl Hale	7; 5	3; 6	6; 3
2	(Bolivia) (Jamaica)	José Antelo; Jermaine Smith	6; 2	7^{7} 6^{5}
3	(Bolivia) (Jamaica)	Sergio Vidal / Jorge Rodrigo Villarroel; Karl Hale / Jermaine Smith	4; 6	7; 5	2; 6

==== Panama vs. Jamaica ====
Panama
3
Fredo Maduro Centre, Panama City, Panama
4 May 1999

Jamaica
0

			1	2	3
1	(Panama) (Jamaica)	Juan Pablo Herrera; Karl Hale	6; 1	2; 6	8; 6
2	(Panama) (Jamaica)	Chadd Valdes; Jermaine Smith	6; 0	7; 5
3	(Panama) (Jamaica)	Arnulfo Courtney / Carlos Silva; Nakia Gordon / Nicholas Malcolm	6; 3	6; 2

==== Bolivia vs. Honduras ====
Bolivia
3
Fredo Maduro Centre, Panama City, Panama
4 May 1999

Honduras
0

			1	2	3
1	(Bolivia) (Honduras)	Javier Taborga; Calton Álvarez	7; 5	6; 4
2	(Bolivia) (Honduras)	José Antelo; Carlos Cáceres	6; 3	6; 3
3	(Bolivia) (Honduras)	Sergio Vidal / Jorge Rodrigo Villarroel; Francklin García / Humberto Rodríguez	3; 6	6; 3	6; 2

==== Panama vs. Bolivia ====
Panama
2
Fredo Maduro Centre, Panama City, Panama
5 May 1999

Bolivia
1

			1	2	3
1	(Panama) (Bolivia)	Juan Pablo Herrera; Javier Taborga	0; 6	6^{4} 7^{7}
2	(Panama) (Bolivia)	Chadd Valdes; José Antelo	6; 3	6; 3
3	(Panama) (Bolivia)	Juan Pablo Herrera / Carlos Silva; Javier Taborga / Sergio Vidal	7^{7} 6^{5}	6; 3

==== Honduras vs. Jamaica ====
Honduras
1
Fredo Maduro Centre, Panama City, Panama
5 May 1999

Jamaica
2

			1	2	3
1	(Honduras) (Jamaica)	Calton Álvarez; Nakia Gordon	6; 3	6; 3
2	(Honduras) (Jamaica)	Carlos Cáceres; Karl Hale	4; 6	6; 4	2; 6
3	(Honduras) (Jamaica)	Carlos Cáceres / Francklin García; Karl Hale / Jermaine Smith	6^{5} 7^{7}	6; 3	2; 6

== 1st to 4th place play-offs ==
=== Semifinals ===
==== Guatemala vs. Bolivia ====
Guatemala
2
Fredo Maduro Centre, Panama City, Panama
6 May 1999

Bolivia
1

			1	2	3
1	(Guatemala) (Bolivia)	Luis Valencia; Javier Taborga	6; 4	2; 6	6; 2
2	(Guatemala) (Bolivia)	Jacobo Chávez; José Antelo	5; 7	2; 6
3	(Guatemala) (Bolivia)	Daniel Chávez Morales / Jacobo Chávez; José Antelo / Javier Taborga	6; 3	6; 4

==== El Salvador vs. Panama ====
El Salvador
2
Fredo Maduro Centre, Panama City, Panama
6 May 1999

Panama
1

			1	2	3
1	(El Salvador) (Panama)	Yari Bernardo; Juan Pablo Herrera	7^{7} 6^{4}	6; 3
2	(El Salvador) (Panama)	Manuel Antonio Tejada Ruiz; Chadd Valdes	6; 1	6; 4
3	(El Salvador) (Panama)	José Baires / Augusto Sanabria; Arnulfo Courtney / Carlos Silva	6; 4	6^{5} 7^{7}	5; 7

=== Final ===
==== Guatemala vs. El Salvador ====
Guatemala
1
Fredo Maduro Centre, Panama City, Panama
7 May 1999

El Salvador
2

			1	2	3
1	(Guatemala) (El Salvador)	Alexander Lehnhoff; Yari Bernardo	6; 4	2; 6	4; 6
2	(Guatemala) (El Salvador)	Daniel Chávez Morales; Manuel Antonio Tejada Ruiz	6; 4	4; 6	3; 6
3	(Guatemala) (El Salvador)	Alexander Lehnhoff / Luis Valencia; José Baires / Augusto Sanabria	6; 4	6; 3

=== 3rd to 4th play-off ===
==== Bolivia vs. Panama ====
Bolivia
0
Fredo Maduro Centre, Panama City, Panama
7 May 1999

Panama
3

			1	2	3
1	(Bolivia) (Panama)	Jorge Rodrigo Villarroel; Carlos Silva	6; 2	1; 6	2; 6
2	(Bolivia) (Panama)	Sergio Vidal; Arnulfo Courtney	6^{3} 7^{7}	4; 6
3	(Bolivia) (Panama)	José Antelo / Javier Taborga; Juan Pablo Herrera / Chadd Valdes	6; 4	6^{5} 7^{7}	2; 6

== 5th to 8th place play-offs ==
=== 5th to 8th play-offs ===
==== Netherlands Antilles vs. Honduras ====
Netherlands Antilles
2
Fredo Maduro Centre, Panama City, Panama
6 May 1999

Honduras
1

			1	2	3
1	(Netherlands Antilles) (Honduras)	Jean-Julien Rojer; Calton Álvarez	1; 6	6; 3	6; 4
2	(Netherlands Antilles) (Honduras)	Elmar Gerth; Carlos Cáceres	6; 4	2; 6	2; 6
3	(Netherlands Antilles) (Honduras)	Kevin Jonckheer / Jean-Julien Rojer; Carlos Cáceres / Francklin García	6; 4	6; 3

==== Antigua and Barbuda vs. Jamaica ====
Antigua and Barbuda
0
Fredo Maduro Centre, Panama City, Panama
6 May 1999

Jamaica
3

			1	2	3
1	(Antigua and Barbuda) (Jamaica)	Jerry Williams; Nakia Gordon	2; 6	6; 3	0; 6
2	(Antigua and Barbuda) (Jamaica)	Phil Williamson; Karl Hale	4; 6	4; 6
3	(Antigua and Barbuda) (Jamaica)	Jerry Williams / Phil Williamson; Nicholas Malcolm / Jermaine Smith	3; 6	6; 3	3; 6

=== 5th to 6th play-off ===
==== Netherlands Antilles vs. Jamaica ====
Netherlands Antilles
2
Fredo Maduro Centre, Panama City, Panama
7 May 1999

Jamaica
1

			1	2	3
1	(Netherlands Antilles) (Jamaica)	Raoul Behr; Nakia Gordon	6^{1} 7^{7}	6^{5} 7^{7}
2	(Netherlands Antilles) (Jamaica)	Elmar Gerth; Jermaine Smith	7^{7} 6^{5}	7^{7} 6^{4}
3	(Netherlands Antilles) (Jamaica)	Kevin Jonckheer / Jean-Julien Rojer; Nicholas Malcolm / Jermaine Smith	6^{4} 7^{7}	6; 4	6; 2

=== 7th to 8th play-off ===
==== Honduras vs. Antigua and Barbuda ====
Honduras
1
Fredo Maduro Centre, Panama City, Panama
7 May 1999

Antigua and Barbuda
2

			1	2	3
1	(Honduras) (Antigua and Barbuda)	Humberto Rodríguez; Fernando Peters	6; 1	7; 5
2	(Honduras) (Antigua and Barbuda)	Francklin García; Phil Williamson	2; 6	6^{1} 7^{7}
3	(Honduras) (Antigua and Barbuda)	Francklin García / Humberto Rodríguez; Jerry Williams / Phil Williamson	3; 6	2; 6
