= 2004 Davis Cup Americas Zone Group III =

International tennis competition

The Group III tournament was held in the Week commencing February 4, in Tegucigalpa, Honduras, on outdoor hard courts.

== Format ==
The eight teams were split into two groups and played in a round-robin format. The top two teams of each group advanced to the promotion pool, from which the two top teams were promoted to the Americas Zone Group II in 2005. The last two placed teams of each group from the preliminary round were relegated into the relegation pool, from which the two bottom teams were relegated to the Americas Zone Group IV in 2005.

== Pool A ==
Team	Pld	W	L	MF	MA
Colombia	3	3	0	9	0
Bolivia	3	2	1	5	4
Honduras	3	1	2	3	6
Panama	3	0	3	1	8

=== Colombia vs. Honduras ===
Colombia
3
Country Club de Tegucigalpa, Tegucigalpa, Honduras
4 February 2004
Hard

Honduras
0

			1	2	3
1	(Colombia) (Honduras)	Michael Quintero; Carlos Cáceres	7; 5	6; 3
2	(Colombia) (Honduras)	Alejandro Falla; Francklin García	6; 2	6; 3
3	(Colombia) (Honduras)	Alejandro Falla / Carlos Salamanca; Carlos Cáceres / Pablo Hernández	6; 4	6; 2

=== Bolivia vs. Panama ===
Bolivia
3
Country Club de Tegucigalpa, Tegucigalpa, Honduras
4 February 2004
Hard

Panama
0

			1	2	3
1	(Bolivia) (Panama)	Carlos Álvarez; Chadd Valdes	6; 3	7; 5
2	(Bolivia) (Panama)	Javier Taborga; Alberto González	6; 4	6; 4
3	(Bolivia) (Panama)	Oscar Blacutt / Mauricio Estivariz; Juan-Pablo Herrera / David López	6; 3	6; 4

=== Colombia vs. Panama ===
Colombia
3
Country Club de Tegucigalpa, Tegucigalpa, Honduras
5 February 2004
Hard

Panama
0

			1	2	3
1	(Colombia) (Panama)	Michael Quintero; Chadd Valdes	6; 3	6; 4
2	(Colombia) (Panama)	Alejandro Falla; Alberto González	6; 2	6; 2
3	(Colombia) (Panama)	Alejandro Falla / Carlos Salamanca; Juan-Pablo Herrera / David López	6; 1	6; 3

=== Bolivia vs. Honduras ===
Bolivia
2
Country Club de Tegucigalpa, Tegucigalpa, Honduras
5 February 2004
Hard

Honduras
1

			1	2	3
1	(Bolivia) (Honduras)	Carlos Álvarez; Calton Álvarez	6; 3	3; 6	1; 6
2	(Bolivia) (Honduras)	Javier Taborga; Carlos Cáceres	6; 2	6; 3
3	(Bolivia) (Honduras)	Oscar Blacutt / Javier Taborga; Francklin García / Pablo Hernández	6; 1	6; 3

=== Colombia vs. Bolivia ===
Colombia
3
Country Club de Tegucigalpa, Tegucigalpa, Honduras
6 February 2004
Hard

Bolivia
0

			1	2	3
1	(Colombia) (Bolivia)	Michael Quintero; Carlos Álvarez	6; 2	6; 2
2	(Colombia) (Bolivia)	Alejandro Falla; Javier Taborga	6; 4	6; 4
3	(Colombia) (Bolivia)	Alejandro Falla / Carlos Salamanca; Oscar Blacutt / Javier Taborga	6; 4	7^{7} 6^{4}

=== Honduras vs. Panama ===
Honduras
2
Country Club de Tegucigalpa, Tegucigalpa, Honduras
6 February 2004
Hard

Panama
1

			1	2	3
1	(Honduras) (Panama)	Calton Álvarez; Chadd Valdes	4; 0			retired
2	(Honduras) (Panama)	Carlos Cáceres; Alberto González	3; 6	2; 6
3	(Honduras) (Panama)	Calton Álvarez / Francklin García; Alberto González / Juan-Pablo Herrera	7; 5	6; 0

== Pool B ==
Team	Pld	W	L	MF	MA
Netherlands Antilles	3	3	0	7	2
El Salvador	3	2	1	7	2
U.S. Virgin Islands	3	1	2	2	7
Trinidad and Tobago	3	0	3	2	7

=== Netherlands Antilles vs. Trinidad and Tobago ===
Netherlands Antilles
2
Country Club de Tegucigalpa, Tegucigalpa, Honduras
4 February 2004
Hard

Trinidad and Tobago
1

			1	2	3
1	(Netherlands Antilles) (Trinidad and Tobago)	Piet Hein Boekel; Richard Brown	4; 6	0; 6
2	(Netherlands Antilles) (Trinidad and Tobago)	Jean-Julien Rojer; Dexter Mahase	6; 1	6; 2
3	(Netherlands Antilles) (Trinidad and Tobago)	Raoul Behr / Jean-Julien Rojer; Richard Brown / Jonathan Gómez	6; 4	6; 3

=== El Salvador vs. U.S. Virgin Islands ===
El Salvador
3
Country Club de Tegucigalpa, Tegucigalpa, Honduras
4 February 2004
Hard

U.S. Virgin Islands
0

			1	2	3
1	(El Salvador) (United States Virgin Islands)	Jaime Cuellar; John Richards	6; 1	7^{7} 6^{2}
2	(El Salvador) (United States Virgin Islands)	Rafael Arévalo; Terrance Eugene Highfield	6; 2	6; 0
3	(El Salvador) (United States Virgin Islands)	Rafael Arévalo / Jaime Cuellar; Kristepher Elien / Terrance Eugene Highfield	6; 2	6; 1

=== Netherlands Antilles vs. U.S. Virgin Islands ===
Netherlands Antilles
3
Country Club de Tegucigalpa, Tegucigalpa, Honduras
5 February 2004
Hard

U.S. Virgin Islands
0

			1	2	3
1	(Netherlands Antilles) (United States Virgin Islands)	Piet Hein Boekel; Kristepher Elien	3; 6	6; 2	6; 3
2	(Netherlands Antilles) (United States Virgin Islands)	Jean-Julien Rojer; Terrance Eugene Highfield	6; 4	6; 1
3	(Netherlands Antilles) (United States Virgin Islands)	Raoul Behr / Jean-Julien Rojer; Kristepher Elien / John Richards	6; 2	6; 2

=== El Salvador vs. Trinidad and Tobago ===
El Salvador
3
Country Club de Tegucigalpa, Tegucigalpa, Honduras
5 February 2004
Hard

Trinidad and Tobago
0

			1	2	3
1	(El Salvador) (Trinidad and Tobago)	Jaime Cuellar; Richard Brown	6; 1	6; 1
2	(El Salvador) (Trinidad and Tobago)	Rafael Arévalo; Dexter Mahase	6; 0	6; 2
3	(El Salvador) (Trinidad and Tobago)	Rafael Arévalo / Jaime Cuellar; Richard Brown / Jonathan Gómez	6; 1	7^{7} 6^{4}

=== Netherlands Antilles vs. El Salvador ===
Netherlands Antilles
2
Country Club de Tegucigalpa, Tegucigalpa, Honduras
6 February 2004
Hard

El Salvador
1

			1	2	3
1	(Netherlands Antilles) (El Salvador)	Piet Hein Boekel; Jaime Cuellar	2; 6	1; 6
2	(Netherlands Antilles) (El Salvador)	Jean-Julien Rojer; Rafael Arévalo	6; 3	6; 3
3	(Netherlands Antilles) (El Salvador)	Raoul Behr / Jean-Julien Rojer; Rafael Arévalo / Jaime Cuellar	6; 2	6; 4

=== Trinidad and Tobago vs. U.S. Virgin Islands ===
Trinidad and Tobago
1
Country Club de Tegucigalpa, Tegucigalpa, Honduras
6 February 2004
Hard

U.S. Virgin Islands
2

			1	2	3
1	(Trinidad and Tobago) (United States Virgin Islands)	Jonathan Gómez; Kristepher Elien	7; 5	6; 4
2	(Trinidad and Tobago) (United States Virgin Islands)	Richard Brown; Terrance Eugene Highfield	4; 6	1; 6
3	(Trinidad and Tobago) (United States Virgin Islands)	Jonathan Gómez / Dexter Mahase; Terrance Eugene Highfield / John Richards	3; 6	4; 6

== Promotion pool ==
The top two teams from each of Pools A and B advanced to the Promotion pool. Results and points from games against the opponent from the preliminary round were carried forward.

Team	Pld	W	L	MF	MA
Colombia	3	3	0	9	0
Netherlands Antilles	3	2	1	4	5
El Salvador	3	1	2	3	6
Bolivia	3	0	3	2	7

Colombia and Netherlands Antilles promoted to Group II for 2005.

=== Colombia vs. Netherlands Antilles ===
Colombia
3
Country Club de Tegucigalpa, Tegucigalpa, Honduras
7 February 2004
Hard

Netherlands Antilles
0

			1	2	3
1	(Colombia) (Netherlands Antilles)	Michael Quintero; Rasid Winklaar	6; 2	6; 0
2	(Colombia) (Netherlands Antilles)	Alejandro Falla; Jean-Julien Rojer	6; 1	6; 4
3	(Colombia) (Netherlands Antilles)	Alejandro Falla / Carlos Salamanca; Raoul Behr / Piet Hein Boekel	6; 3	6; 0

=== Bolivia vs. El Salvador ===
Bolivia
1
Country Club de Tegucigalpa, Tegucigalpa, Honduras
7 February 2004
Hard

El Salvador
2

			1	2	3
1	(Bolivia) (El Salvador)	Oscar Blacutt; Jaime Cuellar	6^{5} 7^{7}	2; 6
2	(Bolivia) (El Salvador)	Javier Taborga; Rafael Arévalo	3; 6	6^{5} 7^{7}
3	(Bolivia) (El Salvador)	Oscar Blacutt / Javier Taborga; Rafael Arévalo / Jaime Cuellar	6; 2	6; 4

=== Colombia vs. El Salvador ===
Colombia
3
Country Club de Tegucigalpa, Tegucigalpa, Honduras
8 February 2004
Hard

El Salvador
0

			1	2	3
1	(Colombia) (El Salvador)	Pablo González; Jaime Cuellar	7; 5	6; 1
2	(Colombia) (El Salvador)	Alejandro Falla; Rafael Arévalo	4; 6	6; 3	6; 3
3	(Colombia) (El Salvador)	Michael Quintero / Carlos Salamanca; Rafael Arévalo / Jaime Cuellar	3; 6	6; 1	6; 1

=== Bolivia vs. Netherlands Antilles ===
Bolivia
1
Country Club de Tegucigalpa, Tegucigalpa, Honduras
8 February 2004
Hard

Netherlands Antilles
2

			1	2	3
1	(Bolivia) (Netherlands Antilles)	Carlos Álvarez; Rasid Winklaar	6; 0	6; 4
2	(Bolivia) (Netherlands Antilles)	Javier Taborga; Jean-Julien Rojer	3; 6	1; 6
3	(Bolivia) (Netherlands Antilles)	Oscar Blacutt / Javier Taborga; Raoul Behr / Jean-Julien Rojer	5; 7	7^{7} 6^{2}	6; 8

== Relegation pool ==
The bottom two teams from Pools A and B were placed in the relegation group. Results and points from games against the opponent from the preliminary round were carried forward.

Team	Pld	W	L	MF	MA
Honduras	3	3	0	8	1
Panama	3	2	1	5	4
U.S. Virgin Islands	3	1	2	3	6
Trinidad and Tobago	3	0	3	2	7

Trinidad & Tobago, US Virgin Islands demoted to Group IV for 2005.

=== Honduras vs. U.S. Virgin Islands ===
Honduras
3
Country Club de Tegucigalpa, Tegucigalpa, Honduras
7 February 2004
Hard

U.S. Virgin Islands
0

			1	2	3
1	(Honduras) (United States Virgin Islands)	Pablo Hernández; John Richards	6; 3	6; 0
2	(Honduras) (United States Virgin Islands)	Calton Álvarez; Terrance Eugene Highfield	6; 3	6; 3
3	(Honduras) (United States Virgin Islands)	Carlos Cáceres / Francklin García; Albert Richards / John Richards	6; 2	6; 4

=== Panama vs. Trinidad and Tobago ===
Panama
2
Country Club de Tegucigalpa, Tegucigalpa, Honduras
7 February 2004
Hard

Trinidad and Tobago
1

			1	2	3
1	(Panama) (Trinidad and Tobago)	David López; Richard Brown	1; 6	7; 5	6; 8
2	(Panama) (Trinidad and Tobago)	Alberto González; Dexter Mahase	7; 5	6; 1
3	(Panama) (Trinidad and Tobago)	Alberto González / David López; Richard Brown / Dexter Mahase	6; 1	6; 2

=== Honduras vs. Trinidad and Tobago ===
Honduras
3
Country Club de Tegucigalpa, Tegucigalpa, Honduras
8 February 2004
Hard

Trinidad and Tobago
0

			1	2	3
1	(Honduras) (Trinidad and Tobago)	Calton Álvarez; Jonathan Gómez	6; 2	6; 4
2	(Honduras) (Trinidad and Tobago)	Carlos Cáceres; Dexter Mahase	6; 4	6; 2
3	(Honduras) (Trinidad and Tobago)	Francklin García / Pablo Hernández; Jermille Danclar / Dexter Mahase	6; 2	6; 4

=== Panama vs. U.S. Virgin Islands ===
Panama
2
Country Club de Tegucigalpa, Tegucigalpa, Honduras
8 February 2004
Hard

U.S. Virgin Islands
1

			1	2	3
1	(Panama) (United States Virgin Islands)	David López; John Richards	4; 6	5; 7
2	(Panama) (United States Virgin Islands)	Alberto González; Terrance Eugene Highfield	6; 0	6; 1
3	(Panama) (United States Virgin Islands)	Alberto González / David López; Terrance Eugene Highfield / John Richards	6; 3	6; 2

== Final standings ==
Rank	Team
1	Colombia
2	Netherlands Antilles
3	El Salvador
4	Bolivia
5	Honduras
6	Panama
7	U.S. Virgin Islands
8	Trinidad and Tobago

- Colombia and Netherlands Antilles promoted to Group II in 2005.
- U.S. Virgin Islands and Trinidad and Tobago relegated to Group IV in 2005.
