= 2000 Davis Cup Americas Zone Group III =

International tennis competition

The Americas Zone was one of the three zones of the regional Davis Cup competition in 2000.

In the Americas Zone there were four different tiers, called groups, in which teams competed against each other to advance to the upper tier. The top two teams in Group III advanced to the Americas Zone Group II in 2001, whereas the bottom two teams were relegated to the Americas Zone Group IV in 2001.

== Participating nations ==
- Bolivia
- Dominican Republic
- Haiti
- Jamaica
- Netherlands Antilles
- Panama
- Puerto Rico
- Trinidad and Tobago

=== Draw ===
- Venue: Liguanea Club, Kingston, Jamaica
- Date: 22–26 March

Group A

	PUR	JAM	PAN	HAI	RR; W–L	Match; W–L	Set; W–L	Standings
Puerto Rico		2–1	3–0	2–1	3–0	7–2 (78%)	15–8 (65%)	1
Jamaica	1–2		3–0	3–0	2–1	7–2 (78%)	16–5 (76%)	2
Panama	0–3	0–3		2–1	1–2	2–7 (22%)	7–15 (32%)	3
Haiti	1–2	0–3	1–2		0–3	2–7 (22%)	6–16 (27%)	4

Group B

	AHO	DOM	BOL	TRI	RR; W–L	Match; W–L	Set; W–L	Standings
Netherlands Antilles		2–1	3–0	3–0	3–0	8–1 (89%)	16–4 (80%)	1
Dominican Republic	1–2		2–1	1–2	1–2	4–5 (44%)	11–13 (46%)	2
Bolivia	0–3	1–2		3–0	1–2	4–5 (44%)	9–11 (45%)	3
Trinidad and Tobago	0–3	2–1	0–3		1–2	2–7 (22%)	8–16 (33%)	4

1st to 4th place play-offs

3rd-4th Play-off
A1	Puerto Rico	2
A2	Jamaica	1

Semifinals
A1	Puerto Rico	1
B2	Dominican Republic	2
A2	Jamaica	1
B1	Netherlands Antilles	2

Final
B2	Dominican Republic	1
B1	Netherlands Antilles	2

5th to 8th place play-offs

7th-8th Play-off
A3	Panama	3
A4	Haiti	0

5th-8th Play-offs
A3	Panama	1
B4	Trinidad and Tobago	2
A4	Haiti	1
B3	Bolivia	2

5th-6th Play-off
B4	Trinidad and Tobago	0
B3	Bolivia	3

=== Final standings ===
Rank	Team
1	Netherlands Antilles
2	Dominican Republic
3	Puerto Rico
4	Jamaica
5	Bolivia
6	Trinidad and Tobago
7	Panama
8	Haiti

- Netherlands Antilles and Dominican Republic promoted to Group II in 2001.
- Panama and Haiti relegated to Group IV in 2001.

== Round robin ==
=== Group A ===
==== Haiti vs. Puerto Rico ====
Haiti
1
Liguanea Club, Kingston, Jamaica
22 March 2000

Puerto Rico
2

			1	2	3
1	(Haiti) (Puerto Rico)	Joel Allen; Juan Carlos Fernández	1; 6	4; 6
2	(Haiti) (Puerto Rico)	Jerry Joseph; Gabriel Montilla	2; 6	4; 6
3	(Haiti) (Puerto Rico)	Joel Allen / Jerry Joseph; Stephen Díaz / Luis Haddock	2; 6	6; 3	6; 4

==== Panama vs. Jamaica ====
Panama
0
Liguanea Club, Kingston, Jamaica
22 March 2000

Jamaica
3

			1	2	3
1	(Panama) (Jamaica)	Juan Pablo Herrera; Ryan Russell	6^{6} 7^{8}	1; 6
2	(Panama) (Jamaica)	Chadd Valdes; Jermaine Smith	3; 6	6^{4} 7^{7}
3	(Panama) (Jamaica)	Braen Aneiros Romero / Arnulfo Courtney; Nakia Gordon / Scott Willinsky	3; 6	5; 7

==== Haiti vs. Panama ====
Haiti
1
Liguanea Club, Kingston, Jamaica
23 March 2000

Panama
2

			1	2	3
1	(Haiti) (Panama)	Jerry Joseph; Chadd Valdes	3; 6	5; 7
2	(Haiti) (Panama)	Joel Allen; Juan Pablo Herrera	7; 5	5; 7	3; 6
3	(Haiti) (Panama)	Joel Allen / Jerry Joseph; Braen Aneiros Romero / Arnulfo Courtney	3; 6	6; 1	6; 3

==== Puerto Rico vs. Jamaica ====
Puerto Rico
2
Liguanea Club, Kingston, Jamaica
23 March 2000

Jamaica
1

			1	2	3
1	(Puerto Rico) (Jamaica)	Juan Carlos Fernández; Ryan Russell	3; 6	4; 6
2	(Puerto Rico) (Jamaica)	Gabriel Montilla; Jermaine Smith	4; 6	6; 3	6; 2
3	(Puerto Rico) (Jamaica)	Stephen Díaz / Gabriel Montilla; Nakia Gordon / Ryan Russell	7^{7} 6^{4}	2; 6	6; 1

==== Haiti vs. Jamaica ====
Haiti
0
Liguanea Club, Kingston, Jamaica
24 March 2000

Jamaica
3

			1	2	3
1	(Haiti) (Jamaica)	Carl-Henry Barthold; Ryan Russell	1; 6	0; 6
2	(Haiti) (Jamaica)	Jerry Joseph; Jermaine Smith	7^{7} 6^{4}	2; 6	2; 6
3	(Haiti) (Jamaica)	Jean-Claude Augustin / Carl-Henry Barthold; Nakia Gordon / Scott Willinsky	2; 6	2; 6

==== Puerto Rico vs. Panama ====
Puerto Rico
3
Liguanea Club, Kingston, Jamaica
24 March 2000

Panama
0

			1	2	3
1	(Puerto Rico) (Panama)	Luis Haddock; Juan Pablo Herrera	4; 6	7^{7} 6^{4}	6; 2
2	(Puerto Rico) (Panama)	Gabriel Montilla; Chadd Valdes	6; 0	6; 2
3	(Puerto Rico) (Panama)	Stephen Díaz / Juan Carlos Fernández; Braen Aneiros Romero / Arnulfo Courtney	5; 7	6; 1	9; 7

=== Group B ===
==== Netherlands Antilles vs. Bolivia ====
Netherlands Antilles
3
Liguanea Club, Kingston, Jamaica
22 March 2000

Bolivia
0

			1	2	3
1	(Netherlands Antilles) (Bolivia)	Elmar Gerth; Daniel Chavarría	6; 2	6; 4
2	(Netherlands Antilles) (Bolivia)	Jean-Julien Rojer; José Antelo	6; 3	6; 3
3	(Netherlands Antilles) (Bolivia)	Raoul Behr / Kevin Jonckheer; Rodrigo Navarro / Jorge Rodrigo Villarroel	6; 3			retired

==== Dominican Republic vs. Trinidad and Tobago ====
Dominican Republic
1
Liguanea Club, Kingston, Jamaica
22 March 2000

Trinidad and Tobago
2

			1	2	3
1	(Dominican Republic) (Trinidad and Tobago)	Genaro Deleon; Simon Evelyn	2; 6	6; 2	4; 6
2	(Dominican Republic) (Trinidad and Tobago)	Rodrigo Vallejo; Shane Stone	1; 6	7^{7} 6^{3}	8; 6
3	(Dominican Republic) (Trinidad and Tobago)	Sixto Camacho / Rodrigo Vallejo; Shane Stone / Troy Stone	4; 6	7^{7} 6^{4}	2; 6

==== Netherlands Antilles vs. Trinidad and Tobago ====
Netherlands Antilles
3
Liguanea Club, Kingston, Jamaica
23 March 2000

Trinidad and Tobago
0

			1	2	3
1	(Netherlands Antilles) (Trinidad and Tobago)	Elmar Gerth; Simon Evelyn	6; 2	6; 3
2	(Netherlands Antilles) (Trinidad and Tobago)	Jean-Julien Rojer; Shane Stone	6; 3	6; 3
3	(Netherlands Antilles) (Trinidad and Tobago)	Raoul Behr / Kevin Jonckheer; Shane Stone / Troy Stone	6; 2	2; 6	6; 2

==== Dominican Republic vs. Bolivia ====
Dominican Republic
2
Liguanea Club, Kingston, Jamaica
23 March 2000

Bolivia
1

			1	2	3
1	(Dominican Republic) (Bolivia)	Víctor Estrella Burgos; Daniel Chavarría	4; 6	4; 6
2	(Dominican Republic) (Bolivia)	Genaro Deleon; José Antelo	6; 0	6; 3
3	(Dominican Republic) (Bolivia)	Sixto Camacho / Rodrigo Vallejo; Daniel Chavarría / Jorge Rodrigo Villarroel	6; 4	3; 6	6; 1

==== Netherlands Antilles vs. Dominican Republic ====
Netherlands Antilles
2
Liguanea Club, Kingston, Jamaica
24 March 2000

Dominican Republic
1

			1	2	3
1	(Netherlands Antilles) (Dominican Republic)	Elmar Gerth; Genaro Deleon	6; 2	6^{1} 7^{7}	6; 4
2	(Netherlands Antilles) (Dominican Republic)	Jean-Julien Rojer; Rodrigo Vallejo	6; 1	7^{7} 6^{3}
3	(Netherlands Antilles) (Dominican Republic)	Raoul Behr / Kevin Jonckheer; Sixto Camacho / Rodrigo Vallejo	5; 7	6; 3	3; 6

==== Bolivia vs. Trinidad and Tobago ====
Bolivia
3
Liguanea Club, Kingston, Jamaica
24 March 2000

Trinidad and Tobago
0

			1	2	3
1	(Bolivia) (Trinidad and Tobago)	Rodrigo Navarro; Randy Hakim	6; 3	6; 3
2	(Bolivia) (Trinidad and Tobago)	José Antelo; Simon Evelyn	4; 6	6; 2	6; 2
3	(Bolivia) (Trinidad and Tobago)	José Antelo / Daniel Chavarría; Simon Evelyn / Troy Stone	4; 6	6; 1	6; 4

== 1st to 4th place play-offs ==
=== Semifinals ===
==== Puerto Rico vs. Dominican Republic ====
Puerto Rico
1
Liguanea Club, Kingston, Jamaica
25 March 2000

Dominican Republic
2

			1	2	3
1	(Puerto Rico) (Dominican Republic)	Juan Carlos Fernández; Genaro Deleon	4; 6	4; 6
2	(Puerto Rico) (Dominican Republic)	Stephen Díaz; Rodrigo Vallejo	4; 6	7^{7} 6^{4}	3; 6
3	(Puerto Rico) (Dominican Republic)	Juan Carlos Fernández / Luis Haddock; Sixto Camacho / Víctor Estrella Burgos	6; 2	6; 4

==== Jamaica vs. Netherlands Antilles ====
Jamaica
1
Liguanea Club, Kingston, Jamaica
25 March 2000

Netherlands Antilles
2

			1	2	3
1	(Jamaica) (Netherlands Antilles)	Ryan Russell; Elmar Gerth	4; 6	6; 2	6; 4
2	(Jamaica) (Netherlands Antilles)	Jermaine Smith; Jean-Julien Rojer	6^{4} 7^{7}	4; 6
3	(Jamaica) (Netherlands Antilles)	Ryan Russell / Jermaine Smith; Elmar Gerth / Jean-Julien Rojer	2; 6	1; 6

=== Final ===
==== Dominican Republic vs. Netherlands Antilles ====
Dominican Republic
1
Liguanea Club, Kingston, Jamaica
26 March 2000

Netherlands Antilles
2

			1	2	3
1	(Dominican Republic) (Netherlands Antilles)	Genaro Deleon; Elmar Gerth	6; 3	4; 6	3; 6
2	(Dominican Republic) (Netherlands Antilles)	Rodrigo Vallejo; Jean-Julien Rojer	3; 6	2; 6
3	(Dominican Republic) (Netherlands Antilles)	Sixto Camacho / Víctor Estrella Burgos; Raoul Behr / Kevin Jonckheer	6; 2	6; 4

=== 3rd to 4th play-off ===
==== Puerto Rico vs. Jamaica ====
Puerto Rico
2
Liguanea Club, Kingston, Jamaica
26 March 2000

Jamaica
1

			1	2	3
1	(Puerto Rico) (Jamaica)	Luis Haddock; Ryan Russell	6; 3	4; 6	2; 6
2	(Puerto Rico) (Jamaica)	Juan Carlos Fernández; Jermaine Smith	6; 1	5; 7	6; 4
3	(Puerto Rico) (Jamaica)	Juan Carlos Fernández / Luis Haddock; Nakia Gordon / Ryan Russell	2; 6	6; 1	6; 2

== 5th to 8th place play-offs ==
=== 5th to 8th play-offs ===
==== Panama vs. Trinidad and Tobago ====
Panama
1
Liguanea Club, Kingston, Jamaica
25 March 2000

Trinidad and Tobago
2

			1	2	3
1	(Panama) (Trinidad and Tobago)	Juan Pablo Herrera; Simon Evelyn	6; 3	6; 4
2	(Panama) (Trinidad and Tobago)	Chadd Valdes; Shane Stone	4; 6	3; 6
3	(Panama) (Trinidad and Tobago)	Braen Aneiros Romero / Juan Pablo Herrera; Simon Evelyn / Troy Stone	3; 6	4; 6

==== Haiti vs. Bolivia ====
Haiti
1
Liguanea Club, Kingston, Jamaica
25 March 2000

Bolivia
2

			1	2	3
1	(Haiti) (Bolivia)	Joel Allen; Jorge Rodrigo Villarroel	6; 1	6; 3
2	(Haiti) (Bolivia)	Jerry Joseph; Rodrigo Navarro	2; 6	1; 6
3	(Haiti) (Bolivia)	Joel Allen / Jerry Joseph; José Antelo / Rodrigo Navarro	6; 3	0; 6	3; 6

=== 5th to 6th play-off ===
==== Trinidad and Tobago vs. Bolivia ====
Trinidad and Tobago
0
Liguanea Club, Kingston, Jamaica
26 March 2000

Bolivia
3

			1	2	3
1	(Trinidad and Tobago) (Bolivia)	Randy Hakim; Rodrigo Navarro	0; 6	3; 6
2	(Trinidad and Tobago) (Bolivia)	Simon Evelyn; José Antelo	6^{5} 7^{7}	1; 6
3	(Trinidad and Tobago) (Bolivia)	Randy Hakim / Troy Stone; Rodrigo Navarro / Jorge Rodrigo Villarroel	4; 6	1; 6

=== 7th to 8th play-off ===
==== Panama vs. Haiti ====
Panama
3
Liguanea Club, Kingston, Jamaica
26 March 2000

Haiti
0

			1	2	3
1	(Panama) (Haiti)	Juan Pablo Herrera; Jean-Claude Augustin	6; 1	3; 6	6; 3
2	(Panama) (Haiti)	Arnulfo Courtney; Carl-Henry Barthold	6; 3	6; 3
3	(Panama) (Haiti)	Arnulfo Courtney / Chadd Valdes; Joel Allen / Jerry Joseph	6; 2	6; 4
