= Luis Delgado (tennis) =

Dominican tennis player

- Country (sports): Dominican Republic
- Born: 18 February 1991 (age 34); Dominican Republic
- Plays: Right-handed
- Prize money: $236

Singles
- Career record: 1–3 (at ATP Tour level, Grand Slam level, and in Davis Cup)
- Career titles: 0

Doubles
- Career record: 0–0 (at ATP Tour level, Grand Slam level, and in Davis Cup)
- Career titles: 0
- Last updated on: 17 January 2021.

Luis Delgado (born 18 February 1991) is a Dominican tennis player.

Delgado has a career-high ITF juniors ranking of 316, achieved on 24 August 2009.

Delgado represented Dominican Republic at the 2007, 2008, 2010, and the 2011 Davis Cup, where he has a W/L record of 1–3.

== Davis Cup ==
=== Participations: (2–3) ===
Group membership World Group (0–0) WG Play-off (0–0) Group I (0–1) Group II (1–2) Group III (0–0) Group IV (0–0)	Matches by surface Hard (0–1) Clay (1–2) Grass (0–0) Carpet (0–0)	Matches by type Singles (1–3) Doubles (0–0)

- ▲ ▼ indicates the outcome of the Davis Cup match followed by the score, date, place of event, the zonal classification and its phase, and the court surface.
