= 1998 Davis Cup Americas Zone Group IV =

International tennis competition

The Americas Zone was one of the three zones of the regional Davis Cup competition in 1998.

In the Americas Zone there were four different tiers, called groups, in which teams competed against each other to advance to the upper tier. The top two teams in Group IV advanced to the Americas Zone Group III in 1999. All other teams remained in Group IV.

== Participating nations ==
- Barbados
- Eastern Caribbean
- Honduras
- Netherlands Antilles
- Saint Lucia
- Trinidad and Tobago
- U.S. Virgin Islands

=== Draw ===
- Venue: St. Lucia Racquet Club, Gros Islet, Saint Lucia
- Date: 23–29 March

	AHO	HON	LCA	TRI	BAR	ISV	ECA	RR; W–L	Match; W–L	Set; W–L	Standings
Netherlands Antilles		2–1	2–1	3–0	3–0	3–0	3–0	6–0	16–2 (89%)	33–5 (87%)	1
Honduras	1–2		2–1	2–1	2–1	2–1	2–1	5–1	11–7 (61%)	24–16 (60%)	2
Saint Lucia	1–2	1–2		1–2	2–1	3–0	2–1	3–3	10–8 (56%)	22–17 (56%)	3
Trinidad and Tobago	0–3	1–2	2–1		2–1	0–3	3–0	3–3	8–10 (44%)	17–21 (45%)	4
Barbados	0–3	1–2	1–2	1–2		2–1	2–1	2–4	7–11 (39%)	17–26 (40%)	5
U.S. Virgin Islands	0–3	1–2	0–3	3–0	1–2		2–1	2–4	7–11 (39%)	16–22 (42%)	6
Eastern Caribbean	0–3	1–2	1–2	0–3	1–2	1–2		0–6	4–14 (22%)	9–31 (23%)	7

- Netherlands Antilles and Honduras promoted to Group III in 1999.

== Results ==
=== Netherlands Antilles vs. Eastern Caribbean ===
Netherlands Antilles
3
St. Lucia Racquet Club, Gros Islet, Saint Lucia
23 March 1998

Eastern Caribbean
0

			1	2	3
1	(Netherlands Antilles) (Eastern Caribbean)	Jean-Julien Rojer; Ronald Liverpool	6; 3	7^{7} 6^{5}
2	(Netherlands Antilles) (Eastern Caribbean)	Elmar Gerth; Kirt Cable	6; 1	6; 0
3	(Netherlands Antilles) (Eastern Caribbean)	Elmar Gerth / Kevin Jonckheer; Ronald Liverpool / Peter Nanton	6; 2	6; 1

=== Barbados vs. Honduras ===
Barbados
1
St. Lucia Racquet Club, Gros Islet, Saint Lucia
23 March 1998

Honduras
2

			1	2	3
1	(Barbados) (Honduras)	James Betts; Calton Álvarez	6; 3	2; 6	3; 6
2	(Barbados) (Honduras)	Duane Williams; Carlos Cáceres	2; 6	2; 6
3	(Barbados) (Honduras)	Bernard Frost / Kodi Lewis; Carlos Cáceres / Francklin García	3; 6	6; 4	7; 5

=== U.S. Virgin Islands vs. Trinidad and Tobago ===
U.S. Virgin Islands
3
St. Lucia Racquet Club, Gros Islet, Saint Lucia
23 March 1998

Trinidad and Tobago
0

			1	2	3
1	(United States Virgin Islands) (Trinidad and Tobago)	Wilbur Callender; Ronald Greaves	7^{7} 6^{3}	6; 2
2	(United States Virgin Islands) (Trinidad and Tobago)	Terrance Eugene Highfield; Floyd Williams	6; 1	6; 2
3	(United States Virgin Islands) (Trinidad and Tobago)	Morris Brown / Terrance Eugene Highfield; Stephen George / Brian Khan	6; 3	6; 2

=== Saint Lucia vs. Eastern Caribbean ===
Saint Lucia
2
St. Lucia Racquet Club, Gros Islet, Saint Lucia
24 March 1998

Eastern Caribbean
1

			1	2	3
1	(Saint Lucia) (Eastern Caribbean)	Vernon Lewis; Ronald Liverpool	6; 1	6; 2
2	(Saint Lucia) (Eastern Caribbean)	Henri Sinson; Kirt Cable	6; 1	6; 3
3	(Saint Lucia) (Eastern Caribbean)	Kane Easter / Glynn James; Hayden Ashton / Kirt Cable	6; 3	5; 7	4; 6

=== Netherlands Antilles vs. U.S. Virgin Islands ===
Netherlands Antilles
3
St. Lucia Racquet Club, Gros Islet, Saint Lucia
24 March 1998

U.S. Virgin Islands
0

			1	2	3
1	(Netherlands Antilles) (United States Virgin Islands)	Jean-Julien Rojer; Wilbur Callender	6; 3	7; 5
2	(Netherlands Antilles) (United States Virgin Islands)	Elmar Gerth; Terrance Eugene Highfield	6; 4	6; 2
3	(Netherlands Antilles) (United States Virgin Islands)	Elmar Gerth / Kevin Jonckheer; Morris Brown / George Lewis	6; 0	6; 3

=== Honduras vs. Trinidad and Tobago ===
Honduras
2
St. Lucia Racquet Club, Gros Islet, Saint Lucia
24 March 1998

Trinidad and Tobago
1

			1	2	3
1	(Honduras) (Trinidad and Tobago)	Calton Álvarez; Brian Khan	6; 4	6; 0
2	(Honduras) (Trinidad and Tobago)	Carlos Cáceres; Stephen George	6; 0	6; 3
3	(Honduras) (Trinidad and Tobago)	Carlos Cáceres / Francklin García; Brian Khan / Floyd Williams	3; 6	4; 6

=== Saint Lucia vs. U.S. Virgin Islands ===
Saint Lucia
3
St. Lucia Racquet Club, Gros Islet, Saint Lucia
25 March 1998

U.S. Virgin Islands
0

			1	2	3
1	(Saint Lucia) (United States Virgin Islands)	Kane Easter; Morris Brown	6; 4	7; 5
2	(Saint Lucia) (United States Virgin Islands)	Vernon Lewis; Terrance Eugene Highfield	6; 1	6; 4
3	(Saint Lucia) (United States Virgin Islands)	Glynn James / Henri Sinson; Wilbur Callender / George Lewis	6; 3	6; 2

=== Netherlands Antilles vs. Barbados ===
Netherlands Antilles
3
St. Lucia Racquet Club, Gros Islet, Saint Lucia
25 March 1998

Barbados
0

			1	2	3
1	(Netherlands Antilles) (Barbados)	Jean-Julien Rojer; James Betts	6; 0	7; 5
2	(Netherlands Antilles) (Barbados)	Elmar Gerth; Duane Williams	6; 0	6; 1
3	(Netherlands Antilles) (Barbados)	Elmar Gerth / Kevin Jonckheer; Bernard Frost / Kodi Lewis	6; 1	6; 3

=== Eastern Caribbean vs. Trinidad and Tobago ===
Eastern Caribbean
0
St. Lucia Racquet Club, Gros Islet, Saint Lucia
25 March 1998

Trinidad and Tobago
3

			1	2	3
1	(Eastern Caribbean) (Trinidad and Tobago)	Ronald Liverpool; Brian Khan	3; 6	2; 6
2	(Eastern Caribbean) (Trinidad and Tobago)	Hayden Ashton; Ronald Greaves	1; 6	0; 6
3	(Eastern Caribbean) (Trinidad and Tobago)	Ronald Liverpool / Peter Nanton; Brian Khan / Floyd Williams	4; 6	5; 7

=== Saint Lucia vs. Trinidad and Tobago ===
Saint Lucia
1
St. Lucia Racquet Club, Gros Islet, Saint Lucia
26 March 1998

Trinidad and Tobago
2

			1	2	3
1	(Saint Lucia) (Trinidad and Tobago)	Vernon Lewis; Ronald Greaves	5; 7	0; 6
2	(Saint Lucia) (Trinidad and Tobago)	Henri Sinson; Floyd Williams	6; 4	7; 5
3	(Saint Lucia) (Trinidad and Tobago)	Glynn James / Henri Sinson; Ronald Greaves / Brian Khan	2; 6	2; 6

=== Barbados vs. Eastern Caribbean ===
Barbados
2
St. Lucia Racquet Club, Gros Islet, Saint Lucia
26 March 1998

Eastern Caribbean
1

			1	2	3
1	(Barbados) (Eastern Caribbean)	Kodi Lewis; Ronald Liverpool	4; 6	6; 3	6; 2
2	(Barbados) (Eastern Caribbean)	Bernard Frost; Kirt Cable	6; 3	6; 4
3	(Barbados) (Eastern Caribbean)	James Betts / Duane Williams; Hayden Ashton / Kirt Cable	6; 3	3; 6	4; 6

=== Honduras vs. U.S. Virgin Islands ===
Honduras
2
St. Lucia Racquet Club, Gros Islet, Saint Lucia
26 March 1998

U.S. Virgin Islands
1

			1	2	3
1	(Honduras) (United States Virgin Islands)	Calton Álvarez; Wilbur Callender	6; 3	1; 6	6; 2
2	(Honduras) (United States Virgin Islands)	Carlos Cáceres; Terrance Eugene Highfield	6; 4	7^{7} 6^{3}
3	(Honduras) (United States Virgin Islands)	Francklin García / Humberto Rodríguez; Wilbur Callender / George Lewis	6^{2} 7^{7}	5; 7

=== Saint Lucia vs. Honduras ===
Saint Lucia
1
St. Lucia Racquet Club, Gros Islet, Saint Lucia
27 March 1998

Honduras
2

			1	2	3
1	(Saint Lucia) (Honduras)	Kane Easter; Calton Álvarez	4; 6	6^{4} 7^{7}
2	(Saint Lucia) (Honduras)	Vernon Lewis; Carlos Cáceres	1; 6	4; 6
3	(Saint Lucia) (Honduras)	Kane Easter / Henri Sinson; Calton Álvarez / Francklin García	6; 1	6; 4

=== Netherlands Antilles vs. Trinidad and Tobago ===
Netherlands Antilles
3
St. Lucia Racquet Club, Gros Islet, Saint Lucia
27 March 1998

Trinidad and Tobago
0

			1	2	3
1	(Netherlands Antilles) (Trinidad and Tobago)	Jean-Julien Rojer; Brian Khan	6; 2	6; 2
2	(Netherlands Antilles) (Trinidad and Tobago)	Elmar Gerth; Ronald Greaves	6; 4	6; 4
3	(Netherlands Antilles) (Trinidad and Tobago)	Elmar Gerth / Kevin Jonckheer; Ronald Greaves / Brian Khan	6; 0	6; 2

=== Barbados vs. U.S. Virgin Islands ===
Barbados
2
St. Lucia Racquet Club, Gros Islet, Saint Lucia
27 March 1998

U.S. Virgin Islands
1

			1	2	3
1	(Barbados) (United States Virgin Islands)	James Betts; Wilbur Callender	7^{7} 6^{4}	7; 5
2	(Barbados) (United States Virgin Islands)	Duane Williams; Terrance Eugene Highfield	0; 6	2; 6
3	(Barbados) (United States Virgin Islands)	James Betts / Bernard Frost; Terrance Eugene Highfield / George Lewis	6; 3	6; 4

=== Saint Lucia vs. Barbados ===
Saint Lucia
2
St. Lucia Racquet Club, Gros Islet, Saint Lucia
28 March 1998

Barbados
1

			1	2	3
1	(Saint Lucia) (Barbados)	Kane Easter; James Betts	6; 3	6; 3
2	(Saint Lucia) (Barbados)	Henri Sinson; Bernard Frost	6; 3	6; 3
3	(Saint Lucia) (Barbados)	Glynn James / Vernon Lewis; Bernard Frost / Kodi Lewis	6; 3	6^{5} 7^{7}	4; 6

=== Netherlands Antilles vs. Honduras ===
Netherlands Antilles
2
St. Lucia Racquet Club, Gros Islet, Saint Lucia
28 March 1998

Honduras
1

			1	2	3
1	(Netherlands Antilles) (Honduras)	Jean-Julien Rojer; Calton Álvarez	6^{2} 7^{7}	1; 6
2	(Netherlands Antilles) (Honduras)	Elmar Gerth; Carlos Cáceres	6; 3	6; 2
3	(Netherlands Antilles) (Honduras)	Elmar Gerth / Kevin Jonckheer; Calton Álvarez / Carlos Cáceres	6; 1	6^{5} 7^{7}	6; 1

=== Eastern Caribbean vs. U.S. Virgin Islands ===
Eastern Caribbean
1
St. Lucia Racquet Club, Gros Islet, Saint Lucia
28 March 1998

U.S. Virgin Islands
2

			1	2	3
1	(Eastern Caribbean) (United States Virgin Islands)	Kirt Cable; Wilbur Callender	4; 6	3; 6
2	(Eastern Caribbean) (United States Virgin Islands)	Hayden Ashton; Terrance Eugene Highfield	1; 6	4; 6
3	(Eastern Caribbean) (United States Virgin Islands)	Hayden Ashton / Kirt Cable; Wilbur Callender / Terrance Eugene Highfield	6; 4	3; 6	10; 8

=== Saint Lucia vs. Netherlands Antilles ===
Saint Lucia
1
St. Lucia Racquet Club, Gros Islet, Saint Lucia
29 March 1998

Netherlands Antilles
2

			1	2	3
1	(Saint Lucia) (Netherlands Antilles)	Vernon Lewis; Jean-Julien Rojer	3; 6	6; 1	6; 2
2	(Saint Lucia) (Netherlands Antilles)	Henri Sinson; Elmar Gerth	2; 6	2; 6
3	(Saint Lucia) (Netherlands Antilles)	Vernon Lewis / Henri Sinson; Raoul Behr / Elmar Gerth	3; 6	5; 7

=== Barbados vs. Trinidad and Tobago ===
Barbados
1
St. Lucia Racquet Club, Gros Islet, Saint Lucia
29 March 1998

Trinidad and Tobago
2

			1	2	3
1	(Barbados) (Trinidad and Tobago)	Kodi Lewis; Brian Khan	2; 6	0; 6
2	(Barbados) (Trinidad and Tobago)	Bernard Frost; Ronald Greaves	2; 6	6; 4	5; 7
3	(Barbados) (Trinidad and Tobago)	James Betts / Duane Williams; Stephen George / Floyd Williams	6; 3	6^{4} 7^{7}	6; 4

=== Eastern Caribbean vs. Honduras ===
Eastern Caribbean
1
St. Lucia Racquet Club, Gros Islet, Saint Lucia
29 March 1998

Honduras
2

			1	2	3
1	(Eastern Caribbean) (Honduras)	Kirt Cable; Calton Álvarez	0; 6	3; 6
2	(Eastern Caribbean) (Honduras)	Hayden Ashton; Carlos Cáceres	1; 6	0; 2		retired
3	(Eastern Caribbean) (Honduras)	Kirt Cable / Ronald Liverpool; Calton Álvarez / Francklin García	4; 6	6; 3	6; 3
