= Pablo Bianchi =

Argentine tennis player (born 1975)

- Country (sports): Argentina; Uruguay
- Born: 27 February 1975 (age 50)
- Plays: Left-handed
- Prize money: $27,191

Singles
- Career record: 4–5 (Davis Cup)
- Highest ranking: No. 287 (21 May 2001)

Grand Slam singles results
- French Open: Q1 (2001)

Doubles
- Highest ranking: No. 365 (12 Oct 1998)

Pablo Bianchi (born 27 February 1975) is an Argentine former professional tennis player of Uruguayan descent.

Born in Argentina, to a Uruguayan father, Bianchi was a left-handed player and began competing on tour in the mid 1990s, before he became a nationalised Uruguayan in 2001 to compete in the Davis Cup. He was a member of the Uruguay Davis Cup team for two years, winning four of his nine singles rubbers.

Bianchi reached his career high singles world ranking of 287 in 2001 when he made the qualifying draw of the French Open. He won two singles and three doubles titles at ITF Futures level.

== ITF Futures titles ==
=== Singles: (2) ===
No.	Date	Tournament	Surface	Opponent	Score
1.	Aug 2000	Argentina F9, Buenos Aires	Clay	(Argentina) Ignacio González King	5–3, 4–0, 4–0
2.	Mar 2001	Argentina F1, Mendoza	Clay	(Argentina) Martín Vassallo Argüello	5–7, 6–2, 6–1

=== Doubles: (3) ===
No.	Date	Tournament	Surface	Partner	Opponents	Score
1.	Jul 1998	France F1, Bourg-en-Bresse	Clay	(United States) Hugo Armando	(France) Jérôme Haehnel (France) Michaël Llodra	6–3, 1–6, 6–2
2.	Jul 1998	France F2, Aix-en-Provence	Clay	(United States) Hugo Armando	(France) Stéphane Matheu (France) Olivier Morel	6–4, 7–5
3.	Jul 1998	France F3, Aix-les-Bains	Clay	(Argentina) Roberto Álvarez	(Czech Republic) Michal Muzikant (Mauritius) Kamil Patel	6–4, 6–2
