= Martín Vilarrubí =

Uruguayan tennis player

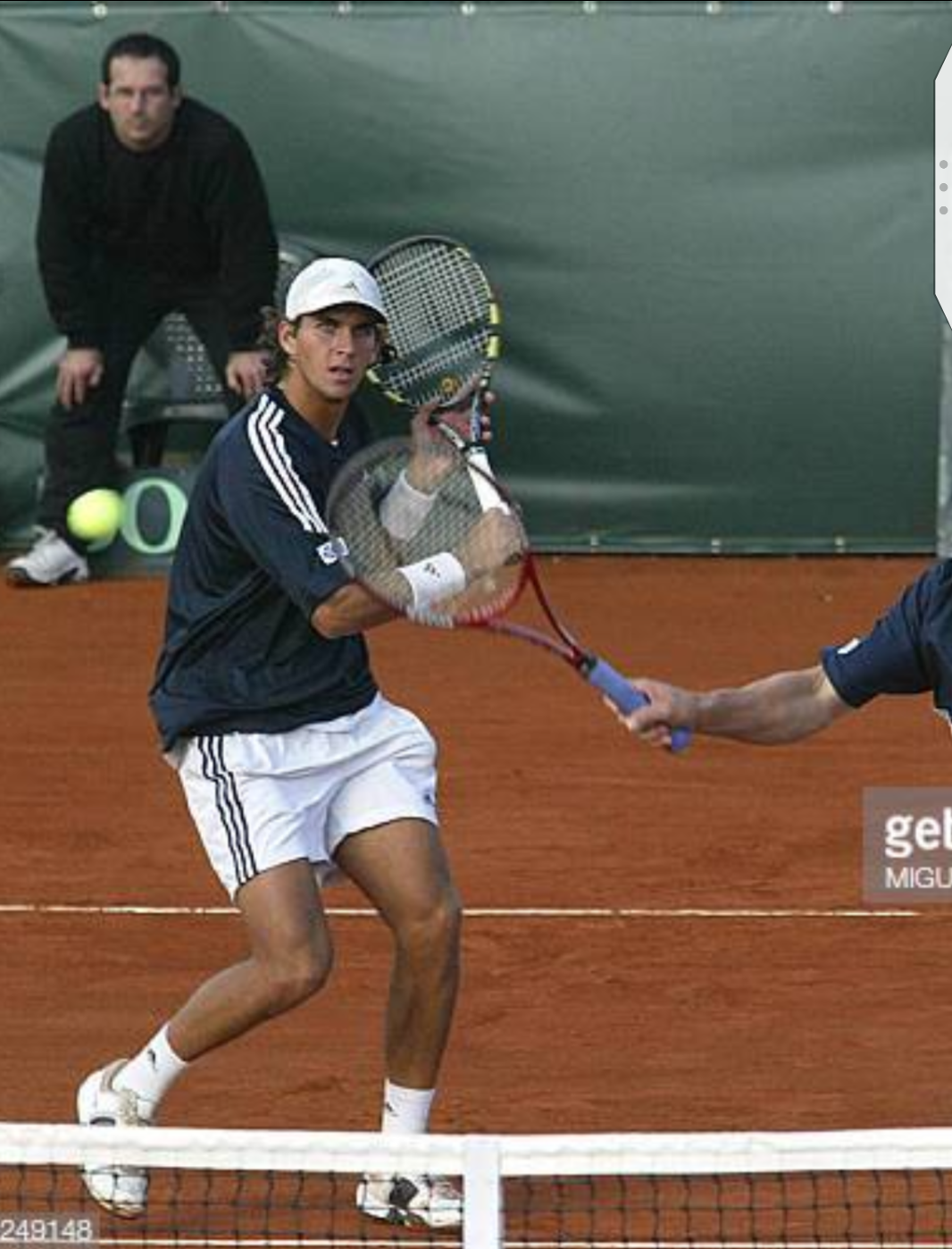
- Full name: Martín Vilarrubí
- Country (sports): Uruguay
- Born: 2 September 1984 (age 40); Montevideo, Uruguay
- Plays: Right-handed
- Prize money: $50,366

Singles
- Career record: 6-4
- Career titles: 0
- Highest ranking: No. 405 (17 July 2006)

Doubles
- Career record: 4-4
- Career titles: 0
- Highest ranking: No. 163 (28 January 2008)

Martín Vilarrubí (born 2 September 1984) is a former professional tennis player from Uruguay.

== Biography ==
Born in Montevideo, Vilarrubí showed promise as a junior, winning several international tournaments. He made the round of 16 of the boys' singles at both the French Open and US Open in 2002, reaching his best junior ranking of seven in the world that year. In Juniors had victories over ex top tens such as Gasquet, Tsonga, Monaco, Soderling.

Vilarrubí was 17 when he began playing Davis Cup tennis for Uruguay. His deciding rubber win over Pablo González handed Uruguay a tie against Colombia in 2003. In addition to the Davis Cup he also represented Uruguay in the Pan American Games and the South American Games. He won both of Uruguay's gold medals at the 2002 South American Games in Brazil, the singles and doubles events, partnering Marcel Felder in the latter. His last Davis Cup match was played in 2007 and finished with a 10/8 overall record, from 11 ties. In 2003 went to two simultaneous surgeries while living in Barcelona and training under the arms of Francis Roig and Jordi Vilaro that put him away long time from the courts. Considered among attractive players while in the tour and sometimes confused with Spanish tennis star Feliciano Lopez because of their kinship.

He played mostly as a doubles player on the professional tour, with 3 Challenger titles, as well as 17 titles on the lower level Futures circuit. Early in 2008, his final year in tennis, he reached his career best doubles ranking of 163 in the world.

Soon after retiring from tennis he founded a chemical company called Pactirol SA. which is among the biggest companies in Uruguay.

== Challenger titles ==
=== Doubles: (3) ===
No.	Year	Tournament	Surface	Partner	Opponents	Score
1.	2006	Gramado, Brazil	Hard	(Brazil) Franco Ferreiro	(Brazil) Marcelo Melo (Brazil) Andre Sa	6–2, 6–4
2.	2007	Milan, Italy	Clay	(Italy) Fabio Colangelo	(Italy) Alessandro Da Col (Italy) Manuel Jorquera	6–7^{2}, 7–6^{8}, 10–8
3.	2007	Freudenstadt, Germany	Clay	(Spain) Marc López	(Austria) Martin Slanar (Czech Republic) Pavel Šnobel	6–2, 6–7^{5}, 10–5
