= Phil Williamson =

American tennis player

- Country (sports): United States; Antigua and Barbuda
- Born: May 29, 1965 (age 60) Mt Vernon, New York
- Turned pro: 1987
- Plays: Left-handed (one-handed backhand)
- Prize money: $41,716

Singles
- Career record: 0–3
- Highest ranking: No. 297 (August 3, 1992)

Grand Slam singles results
- US Open: 1R (1987, 1991, 1993)

Doubles
- Career record: 5–5
- Highest ranking: No. 138 (August 14, 1989)

Grand Slam doubles results
- US Open: 1R (1989)

Phil Williamson (born May 29, 1965) is a former professional tennis player from the United States who competed for Antigua and Barbuda in the Davis Cup.

== Career ==
Phil Williamson was the number one player for Columbia University before joining the professional circuit in 1987.

At the 1987 US Open, Williamson made it through qualifying and faced Australian John Fitzgerald in the first round. He was beaten in straight sets.

Williamson played only in the men's doubles at the 1989 US Open, with Nduka Odizor. They lost in the opening round to Scott Davis and David Pate. Also that year, Williamson teamed up with Todd Nelson at the Boston Pro Championships and the pair finished runners-ups.

He also competed in the main draw of the US Open in 1991 and 1993, but was unable to progress past the first round.

Williamson played Davis Cup tennis for Antigua and Barbuda from their competition debut in 1996, until 1999. He won 20 of his 32 rubbers.

== Grand Prix career finals ==
=== Doubles: 1 (0–1) ===
Result	W-L	Date	Tournament	Surface	Partner	Opponents	Score
Loss	0–1	Jul 1989	Boston, United States	Clay	(United States) Todd Nelson	(Ecuador) Andrés Gómez (Argentina) Alberto Mancini	6–7, 2–6
