= Francisco Rodríguez (tennis) =

Paraguayan tennis player

- Country (sports): Paraguay
- Born: 18 March 1976 (age 50)
- Plays: Right-handed
- Prize money: $31,717

Singles
- Career record: 10–6 (Davis Cup)
- Highest ranking: No. 373 (4 Oct 2004)

Doubles
- Career record: 4–4 (Davis Cup)

Francisco Rodríguez (born 18 March 1976) is a Paraguayan former professional tennis player.

== Tennis career ==
Rodríguez began playing tennis at the age of 10. He grew up playing on clay courts, which would become his most successful surface. Rodríguez played collegiate tennis for the University of Alabama before turning professional, earning All-American honours for singles in both 1998 and 1999. He graduated from the University of Alabama in 2000 with a degree in finance, and moved to Atlanta later that year to pursue professional tennis. On the professional tour he won his first ITF Futures singles title in 2003 at Montego Bay and during his career won a further five Futures titles in doubles. He had a career high singles world ranking of 373, attained in 2004. Rodríguez was coached by Roberto Wiesmann, a Paraguayan tennis player who has coached other South American players, including Rossana Neffa-DeLos Rios.

A member of the Paraguay Davis Cup team from 1998 to 2007, Rodríguez featured in a total of 13 ties and won 19 rubbers, 14 of which came in singles. In 2004 he had an upset win over Brazil's top player Marcos Daniel, 11–9 in the fifth set, which helped Paraguay qualify for the Davis Cup World Group playoffs.

== Personal life ==
Soon after retiring, Rodríguez came out as gay in 2008 in a feature in Out.
