= Javier Taborga =

Bolivian tennis player

- Full name: Paulo Javier Taborga
- Country (sports): Bolivia
- Born: 15 April 1979 (age 46) La Paz, Bolivia
- Height: 6 ft 1 in (185 cm)
- Plays: Left-handed
- Prize money: $11,882

Singles
- Career record: 0–0
- Highest ranking: No. 519 (11 August 2003)

Doubles
- Career record: 0–0
- Highest ranking: No. 419 (3 November 2003)

Paulo Javier Taborga (born 15 April 1979) is a Bolivian former professional tennis player.

A left-handed player from La Paz, Taborga was a doubles silver medalist at the 1997 Bolivarian Games, debuting for Bolivia's Davis Cup team the following year. He earned the top national ranking in Bolivia during his career.

Taborga played collegiate tennis in the United States for the University of Notre Dame, where as a senior in 2002 he received All-American honors and was an NCAA singles championship participant. That year he also achieved the distinction of registering wins over both the top ranked singles player and doubles duo in college tennis.

Following college he turned professional and had a best singles world ranking of 519, with four ITF Futures titles as a doubles player. He made his last Davis Cup appearance in 2004, having featured in a total of 23 ties, for 21 overall wins. Later he had a younger brother Carlos represent Bolivia in the Davis Cup.

== ITF Futures finals ==
=== Singles: 2 (0–2) ===
Result	W–L	Date	Tournament	Surface	Opponent	Score
Loss	0–1	Nov 2002	Barbados F1, Bridgetown	Hard	(Netherlands Antilles) Jean-Julien Rojer	2–6, 1–6
Loss	0–2	Jul 2003	Ecuador F2, Guayaquil	Clay	(Ecuador) Carlos Avellán	6–1, 4–6, 6–7^{(6)}

=== Doubles: 5 (4–1) ===
Result	W–L	Date	Tournament	Surface	Partner	Opponents	Score
Loss	0–1	Nov 2002	Barbados F1, Bridgetown	Hard	(United States) Mirko Pehar	(Netherlands) Jean-Julien Rojer (Jamaica) Ryan Russell	4–6, 6–4, 1–6
Win	1–1	Jul 2003	Ecuador F2, Guayaquil	Clay	(Mexico) Juan Manuel Elizondo	(Argentina) Matias De Genaro (Argentina) Lionel Noviski	7–6^{(5)}, 7–5
Win	2–1	Jul 2003	Ecuador F3, Villamil	Hard	(Argentina) Sebastián Decoud	(Venezuela) Juan De Armas (Venezuela) Jhonnatan Medina-Álvarez	4–6, 7–5, 7–6^{(2)}
Win	3–1	Sep 2003	Bolivia F2, La Paz	Clay	(Colombia) Pablo González	(Argentina) Patricio Arquez (Argentina) Sebastián Decoud	7–6^{(1)}, 6–2
Win	4–1	Oct 2003	Colombia F1, Medellín	Clay	(Argentina) Sebastián Decoud	(Argentina) Carlos Berlocq (Brazil) Ronaldo Carvalho	7–6^{(3)}, 7–6^{(4)}
