= Jhonson García =

Dominican Republic tennis player

- Country (sports): Dominican Republic
- Born: 1 October 1980 (age 44); Santo Domingo
- Plays: Right-handed
- Prize money: $12,601

Singles
- Career record: 19–14 (Davis Cup)
- Highest ranking: No. 547 (27 November 2006)

Doubles
- Career record: 8–12 (Davis Cup)
- Highest ranking: No. 871 (3 April 2006)
Medal record
Central American and Caribbean Games
Gold medal – first place	2006 Cartagena	Men's Singles
Silver medal – second place	2006 Cartagena	Men's Doubles
Silver medal – second place	2002 San Salvador	Men's Team
Bronze medal – third place	1998 Maracaibo	Men's Team
Bronze medal – third place	1998 Maracaibo	Mixed Doubles

Jhonson García (born 1 October 1980) is a Dominican Republic former professional tennis player.

García featured in 26 Davis Cup ties for the Dominican Republic, between 1998 and 2011. One of his best wins came in 1999 against Costa Rica's Juan Antonio Marín, who was then ranked 69 in the world. In 2009 he won the deciding fifth rubber, over Daniel Vallverdú, in the American Zone Group II final against Venezuela, which earned the Dominican Republic promotion to Group I for the first time.

A five-time medalist at the Central American and Caribbean Games, García also represented the Dominican Republic in three editions of the region's premier multi-sport event, the Pan American Games. He made his Pan American Games debut in 1999, then in 2003 was a quarter-finalist in the singles, before making his last appearance in 2007, when he and Víctor Estrella Burgos were beaten in the bronze medal play-off for doubles.
