= Dominican Republic Davis Cup team =

National tennis team

Dominican Republic
- Captain: Rafael Moreno
- ITF ranking: 48 (6 December 2021)
- Colors: Blue & Red
- First year: 1989
- Years played: 32
- Ties played (W–L): 89 (49–40)
- Best finish: WG Play-offs (2015)
- Most total wins: Víctor Estrella (65–40)
- Most singles wins: Víctor Estrella (43–17)
- Most doubles wins: Víctor Estrella (22–23)
- Best doubles team: Víctor Estrella/Jhonson García (8–11)
- Most ties played: Víctor Estrella (48)
- Most years played: Víctor Estrella (21)

The Dominican Republic national tennis team represents the Dominican Republic in Davis Cup tennis competition and are governed by the Federación Dominicana de Tenis.

The Dominican Republic currently compete in the Americas Zone of Group I.

== History ==
The Dominican Republic competed in its first Davis Cup in 1989.

In 2010, the Dominican Republic reached Americas Zone Group I for the first time.

The country once again reached Americas Zone Group I in 2012 after defeating Mexico in the final, with a 3–2 result.

In September, 2013, the Dominican Republic maintained its Americas Zone Group I status after beating Chile 4–1 in the relegation play-off.

In July, 2015, the team defeated Ecuador, and for the first time will face World Group play-offs against Germany on home soil.

== Current Team (2022) ==
- Nick Hardt
- Peter Bertran
- Víctor Estrella Burgos (Doubles player)
- Juan Berrido-Fernández (Captain-player)

== See also ==
- Davis Cup
- Dominican Republic Billie Jean King Cup team
