= Jamaica Davis Cup team =

National tennis team

Jamaica
- Association: Tennis Jamaica
- Confederation: COTECC
- Captain: Dominic Pagon
- ITF ranking: 60 ▲8 (7 February 2023)
- Colors: green and yellow
- First year: 1988 (1953 as Caribbean/West Indies)
- Years played: 26
- Ties played (W–L): 89 (42-46)
- Years in World Group: 0
- Davis Cup titles: 0
- Runners-up: 0
- Most total wins: Rowland Phillips (40–26)
- Most singles wins: Rowland Phillips (27-14)
- Most doubles wins: Rowland Phillips (13-12)
- Best doubles team: Douglas Burke/Karl Hale (8-5)
- Most ties played: Rowland Phillips (38)
- Most years played: Rowland Phillips (10), Jermaine Smith (10), Karl Hale (10)

The Jamaica National tennis team represents Jamaica in Davis Cup tennis competition and are governed by Tennis Jamaica.

Jamaica currently compete in the World Group II following their defeat of Estonia during the World Group II Playoffs in February 2023.

== History ==
Jamaica competed in its first Davis Cup in 1988.

== Current team (2022) ==
- Blaise Bicknell
- Rowland Phillips
- John Chin
- Jacob Bicknell
- Daniel Azar (Junior player)

== Recent performances ==
Here is the list of all match-ups since 1988, when the Jamaican Davis Cup team debuted.

=== 1980s ===
Year	Competition	Date	Location	Opponent	Score	Result
1988	Americas Group II QF	05 Feb - 07 Feb	Eric Bell Tennis Complex	Hati	5-0	Win
1988	Americas Group II Semi Finals	08 Apr - 11 Apr	Eric Bell Tennis Complex	Venezuela	2-3	Loss
1989	Americas Group II QF	05 Feb	Jamaica LTA	Chile	1-4	Loss

=== 1990s ===
Year	Competition	Date	Location	Opponent	Score	Result
1990	Americas Group II, 1st Round	2-4 Feb	Caracas (VEN)	Venezuela	0–5	Loss
1991	Americas Group II, 1st Round	1-3 Feb	Kingston (JAM)	Colombia	2–3	Loss
1992	Americas Group III, Pool B	20 Mar	San Salvador (SLV)	Puerto Rico	1–2	Loss
1992	Americas Group III, Pool B	21 Mar	San Salvador (SLV)	El Salvador	0–3	Loss
1992	Americas Group III, Pool B	22 Mar	San Salvador (SLV)	Bolivia	3–0	Win
1993	Americas Group III, Group Stage	8 Mar	San José (CRC)	Trinidad and Tobago	2–1	Win
1993	Americas Group III, Group Stage	9 Mar	San José (CRC)	Bolivia	3–0	Win
1993	Americas Group III, Group Stage	10 Mar	San José (CRC)	Barbados	2–1	Win
1993	Americas Group III, Group Stage	12 Mar	San José (CRC)	Eastern Caribbean	2–1	Win
1993	Americas Group III, Group Stage	12 Mar	San José (CRC)	El Salvador	2–1	Win
1993	Americas Group III, Group Stage	13 Mar	San José (CRC)	Costa Rica	3–0	Win
1993	Americas Group III, Group Stage	14 Mar	San José (CRC)	Guatemala	0–3	Loss
1994	Americas Group II, 1st Round	4–6 Feb	Ottawa (CAN)	Canada	0–5	Loss
1994	Americas Group II, Relegation Play-off	25–27 March	Guatemala City (GUA)	Guatemala	1–4	Loss
1995	Americas Group III, Pool B	3 Mar	Santo Domingo (DOM)	Trinidad and Tobago	2–1	Win
1995	Americas Group III, Pool B	4 Mar	Santo Domingo (DOM)	Barbados	1–2	Loss
1995	Americas Group III, Pool B	5 Mar	Santo Domingo (DOM)	El Salvador	0–3	Loss
1996	Americas Group III, Pool B	6 Mar	San Salvador (SLV)	Bolivia	2–1	Win
1996	Americas Group III, Pool B	7 Mar	San Salvador (SLV)	Eastern Caribbean	2–1	Win
1996	Americas Group III, Pool B	8 Mar	San Salvador (SLV)	Bermuda	3–0	Win
1996	Americas Group III, Pool B	9 Mar	San Salvador (SLV)	El Salvador	1–2	Loss
1996	Americas Group III, Pool B	10 Mar	San Salvador (SLV)	Panama	0–3	Loss
1997	Americas Group III, Pool B	29 Apr	Southampton (BER)	Guatemala	1–2	Loss
1997	Americas Group III, Pool B	30 Apr	Southampton (BER)	Bolivia	3–0	Win
1997	Americas Group III, Pool B	1 May	Southampton (BER)	Dominican Republic	2–1	Win
1997	Americas Group III 1st-4th Playoff, 1st Round	2 May	Southampton (BER)	Panama	2–1	Win
1997	Americas Group III 1st-4th Playoff, 2nd Round	3 May	Southampton (BER)	Guatemala	0–3	Loss
1998	Americas Group II, 1st Round	3-5 Apr	Jesús María (PER)	Peru	0–5	Loss
1998	Americas Group II, Relegation Play-off	17–19 July	Asunción (PAR)	Paraguay	0–5	Loss
1999	Americas Group III, Pool B	3 May	Panama City (PAN)	Bolivia	1–2	Loss
1999	Americas Group III, Pool B	4 May	Panama City (PAN)	Panama	0–3	Loss
1999	Americas Group III, Pool B	5 May	Panama City (PAN)	Honduras	2–1	Win
1999	Americas Group III 5th-8th Playoff, 1st Round	6 May	Panama City (PAN)	Antigua and Barbuda	3–0	Win
1999	Americas Group III 5th-8th Playoff, 2nd Round	7 May	Panama City (PAN)	Netherlands Antilles	1–2	Loss

=== 2000s ===
Year	Competition	Date	Location	Opponent	Score	Result
2000	Americas Group III, Pool A	22 Mar	Kingston (JAM)	Panama	3–0	Win
2000	Americas Group III, Pool A	23 Mar	Kingston (JAM)	Puerto Rico	1–2	Loss
2000	Americas Group III, Pool A	24 Mar	Kingston (JAM)	Haiti	3–0	Win
2000	Americas Group III 1st-4th Playoff, 1st Round	25 Mar	Kingston (JAM)	Netherlands Antilles	1–2	Loss
2000	Americas Group III 1st-4th Playoff, Play-off	26 Mar	Kingston (JAM)	Puerto Rico	1–2	Loss
2001	Americas Group III, Pool	14 Mar	Cuba (CUB)	Bolivia	3–0	Win
2001	Americas Group III, Pool	15 Mar	Cuba (CUB)	Bermuda	3–0	Win
2001	Americas Group III, Pool	16 Mar	Cuba (CUB)	Cuba	1–2	Loss
2001	Americas Group III 1st-4th Playoff, 1st Round	17 Mar	Cuba (CUB)	Trinidad and Tobago	0–3	Loss
2001	Americas Group III 1st-4th Playoff, Play-off	18 Mar	Cuba (CUB)	El Salvador	2–1	Win
2002	Americas Group III, Pool B	3 Apr	San Salvador (SLV)	Costa Rica	3–0	Win
2002	Americas Group III, Pool B	4 Apr	San Salvador (SLV)	Honduras	3–0	Win
2002	Americas Group III, Pool B	5 Apr	San Salvador (SLV)	Haiti	1–2	Loss
2002	Americas Group III, Promotion pool	6 Apr	San Salvador (SLV)	Dominican Republic	1–2	Loss
2002	Americas Group III, Promotion pool	7 Apr	San Salvador (SLV)	El Salvador	2–1	Win
2003	Americas Group III, Pool A	31 Mar	Port of Spain (TRI)	Bolivia	2–1	Win
2003	Americas Group III, Pool A	1 Apr	Port of Spain (TRI)	Saint Lucia	3–0	Win
2003	Americas Group III, Pool A	2 Apr	Port of Spain (TRI)	Guatemala	2–1	Win
2003	Americas Group III, Promotion pool	3 Apr	Port of Spain (TRI)	El Salvador	3–0	Win
2003	Americas Group III, Promotion pool	4 Apr	Port of Spain (TRI)	Puerto Rico	2–1	Win
2004	Americas Group II, 1st Round	4-6 Feb	Kingston (JAM)	Mexico	1–4	Loss
2004	Americas Group II, Relegation Play-off	9-11 Apr	Bayamón (PUR)	Puerto Rico	3–2	Win
2005	Americas Group II, 1st Round	4-6 Mar	Kingston (JAM)	Dominican Republic	2–3	Loss
2005	Americas Group II, Relegation Play-off	15-17 Jul	Kingston (JAM)	Cuba	3–1	Win
2006	Americas Group II, 1st Round	10-12 Feb	Santiago de los Caballeros (DOM)	Dominican Republic	0–5	Loss
2006	Americas Group II, Relegation Play-off	7-9 Apr	Montego Bay (JAM)	Guatemala	3–1	Win
2007	Americas Group II, 1st Round	9-11 Feb	Punta del Este (URU)	Uruguay	0–5	Loss
2007	Americas Group II, Relegation Play-off	6-8 Apr	Kingston (JAM)	Netherlands Antilles	0–5	Loss
2008	Americas Group III, Group A	17 Jul	Tegucigalpa (HON)	Honduras	3–0	Win
2008	Americas Group III, Group A	18 Jul	Tegucigalpa (HON)	Barbados	1–2	Loss
2008	Americas Group III, Group A	19 Jul	Tegucigalpa (HON)	Guatemala	2–1	Win
2008	Americas Group III, 1st-4th playoff	20 Jul	Tegucigalpa (HON)	Puerto Rico	2–1	Win
2009	Americas Group II, 1st Round	6–8 Mar	Mexico City (MEX)	Mexico	0–5	Loss
2009	Americas Group II, Relegation Play-off	10–12 Jul	Curaçao (ANT)	Netherlands Antilles	0–5	Loss

=== 2010s ===
Year	Competition	Date	Location	Opponent	Score	Result
2010	Americas Group III, Group A	7 Jul	San Juan (PUR)	Aruba	2–1	Win
2010	Americas Group III, Group A	9 Jul	San Juan (PUR)	Bahamas	0–3	Loss
2010	Americas Group III, Promotion pool	10 Jul	San Juan (PUR)	Puerto Rico	0–3	Loss
2010	Americas Group III, Promotion pool	11 Jul	San Juan (PUR)	Haiti	0–3	Loss
2011	Americas Group III, Group A	15 Jun	Santa Cruz (BOL)	Costa Rica	0–3	Loss
2011	Americas Group III, Group A	16 Jun	Santa Cruz (BOL)	Guatemala	0–3	Loss
2011	Americas Group III, Group A	17 Jun	Santa Cruz (BOL)	Honduras	2–1	Win
2011	Americas Group III, Relegation pool	18 Jun	Santa Cruz (BOL)	Aruba	1–2	Loss
2011	Americas Group III, Relegation pool	19 Jun	Santa Cruz (BOL)	Bahamas	0–3	Loss
2012	Americas Group III, Group B	18 Jun	Tobago (TRI)	Costa Rica	0–3	Loss
2012	Americas Group III, Group B	20 Jun	Tobago (TRI)	Bahamas	2–1	Win
2012	Americas Group III, Group B	21 Jun	Tobago (TRI)	U.S. Virgin Islands	3–0	Win
2012	Americas Group III, Group B	22 Jun	Tobago (TRI)	Panama	2–1	Win
2013	Americas Group III, Pool A	17 Jun	La Paz (BOL)	Bolivia	0–3	Loss
2013	Americas Group III, Pool A	19 Jun	La Paz (BOL)	Cuba	2–1	Win
2013	Americas Group III, Pool A	21 Jun	La Paz (BOL)	Paraguay	0–3	Loss
2013	Americas Group III, 5th-6th play-off	22 Jun	La Paz (BOL)	Honduras	0–3	Loss
2014	Americas Group III, Pool B	3 Jun	Humacao (PUR)	Puerto Rico	0–3	Loss
2014	Americas Group III, Pool B	4 Jun	Humacao (PUR)	Trinidad and Tobago	2–1	Win
2014	Americas Group III, Pool B	5 Jun	Humacao (PUR)	Costa Rica	0–3	Loss
2014	Americas Group III, Pool B	6 Jun	Humacao (PUR)	Bermuda	1–2	Loss
2014	Americas Group III, 7th-8th play-off	7 Jun	Humacao (PUR)	Panama	1–2	Loss
2015	Americas Group III, Group B	20 Jul	Panama City (PAN)	Bermuda	2–1	Win
2015	Americas Group III, Group B	21 Jul	Panama City (PAN)	Guatemala	1–2	Loss
2015	Americas Group III, Group B	23 Jul	Panama City (PAN)	Trinidad and Tobago	3–0	Win
2015	Americas Group III, Group B	24 Jul	Panama City (PAN)	Bahamas	2–1	Win
2015	Americas Group III, Promotion play-off	25 Jul	Panama City (PAN)	Paraguay	0–2	Loss
2016	Americas Group III, Group A	11 Jul	La Paz (BOL)	Cuba	3–0	Win
2016	Americas Group III, Group A	12 Jul	La Paz (BOL)	Panama	3–0	Win
2016	Americas Group III, Group A	14 Jul	La Paz (BOL)	Bolivia	0–3	Loss
2016	Americas Group III, Promotion play-off	16 Jul	La Paz (BOL)	Bahamas	0–2	Loss

=== 2020s ===
Year	Competition	Date	Location	Opponent	Score	Result
2020	World Group II Playoffs	March 7	Polideportivo de Ciudad Merliot, San Salvador	El Salvador	1-3	Loss
2021	Americas Group III	June 30	Centro de Alto Rendimiento Fred Maduro, Panama City	US Virgin Islands	3-0	Loss
2021	Americas Group III	July 1	Centro de Alto Rendimiento Fred Maduro, Panama City	Panama	3-0	Win
2021	Americas Group III	July 2	Centro de Alto Rendimiento Fred Maduro, Panama City	Puerto Rico	2-1	Win
2021	Americas Group III	July 3	Centro de Alto Rendimiento Fred Maduro, Panama City	Bahamas	2-0	Win
2022	World Group II Playoffs	March 5	Ace Tennis Club, Athens	Greece	2-3	Loss
2022	Americas Group III	June 22	Costa Rica Country Club, Escazu,	Costa Rica	2-1	Win
2022	Americas Group III	June 23	Costa Rica Country Club, Escazu,	Bahamas	2-1	Win
2022	Americas Group III	June 24	Costa Rica Country Club, Escazu,	Paraguay	1-2	Loss
2022	Americas Group III	June 25	Costa Rica Country Club, Escazu,	Panama	3-0	Win
2023	World Group II Playoffs	Feb 4	Eric Bell Tennis Complex, Kingston	Estonia	3-2	Win
2023	World Group II	Sept 15	Automobile and Touring Club of Lebanon	Lebanon	0-4	Loss
2024	World Group II Playoffs	Feb TBD	Eric Bell Tennis Complex, Kingston	Barbados	TBD	TBD

== See also ==
- Davis Cup
- Jamaica Billie Jean King Cup team
