= 2001 Davis Cup Americas Zone Group III =

International tennis competition

The Americas Zone was one of the three zones of the regional Davis Cup competition in 2001.

In the Americas Zone there were four different tiers, called groups, in which teams competed against each other to advance to the upper tier. The top two teams in Group III advanced to the Americas Zone Group II in 2002, whereas the bottom two teams were relegated to the Americas Zone Group IV in 2002.

== Participating nations ==
- Bermuda
- Bolivia
- Cuba
- El Salvador
- Jamaica
- Honduras
- Puerto Rico
- Trinidad and Tobago

== Draw ==
- Venue: Cuba
- Date: 14–18 March

Group A

| | TRI | ESA | HON | PUR | RR; W–L | Match; W–L | Set; W–L | Standings |
| Trinidad and Tobago | | 2–1 | 2–1 | 0–3 | 2–1 | 4–5 (44%) | 18–15 (55%) | 1 |
| El Salvador | 1–2 | | 2–1 | 2–1 | 2–1 | 5–4 (56%) | 17–17 (50%) | 2 |
| Honduras | 1–2 | 1–2 | | 2–1 | 1–2 | 4–5 (44%) | 13–19 (41%) | 4 |
| Puerto Rico | 3–0 | 1–2 | 1–2 | | 1–2 | 5–4 (56%) | 22–19 (54%) | 3 |

Group B

| | CUB | JAM | BOL | BER | RR; W–L | Match; W–L | Set; W–L | Standings |
| Cuba | | 2–1 | 3–0 | 3–0 | 3–0 | 8–1 (89%) | 25–6 (81%) | 1 |
| Jamaica | 1–2 | | 3–0 | 3–0 | 2–1 | 7–2 (78%) | 22–11 (67%) | 2 |
| Bolivia | 0–3 | 0–3 | | 2–1 | 1–2 | 2–7 (22%) | 8–23 (26%) | 3 |
| Bermuda | 0–3 | 0–3 | 1–2 | | 0–3 | 1–8 (11%) | 10–25 (29%) | 4 |

1st to 4th place play-offs

3rd-4th Play-off
B2 | Jamaica | 2
A2 | El Salvador | 1

Semifinals
A1 | Trinidad and Tobago | 3
B2 | Jamaica | 0
A2 | El Salvador | 1
B1 | Cuba | 2

Final
A1 | Trinidad and Tobago | 0
B1 | Cuba | 2

5th to 8th place play-offs

7th-8th Play-off
A3 | Honduras | 2
A4 | Puerto Rico | 0

5th-8th Play-offs
A3 | Honduras | 3
B4 | Bermuda | 0
A4 | Puerto Rico | 2
B3 | Bolivia | 1

5th-6th Play-off
B4 | Bermuda | 0
B3 | Bolivia | 2

=== Final standings ===
| Rank | Team |
|---|---|
| 1 | Cuba |
| 2 | Trinidad and Tobago |
| 3 | Jamaica |
| 4 | El Salvador |
| 5 | Honduras |
| 6 | Puerto Rico |
| 7 | Bolivia |
| 8 | Bermuda |

- Cuba and Trinidad and Tobago promoted to Group II in 2002.
- Bolivia and Bermuda relegated to Group IV in 2002.

== Round robin ==
=== Group A ===
==== El Salvador vs. Honduras ====
El Salvador
2
Cuba
14 March 2001

Honduras
1

| | | | 1 | 2 | 3 | 4 | 5 |
|---|---|---|---|---|---|---|---|
| 1 | (El Salvador) (Honduras) | Manuel Antonio Tejada Ruiz; Christian Kawas | 5; 3 | 4; 0 | 4; 1 |
| 2 | (El Salvador) (Honduras) | José Baires; Carlos Cáceres | 5^{8} 4^{6} | 5^{7} 4^{3} | 2; 4 | 4; 2 |
| 3 | (El Salvador) (Honduras) | Rafael Fuentes / Samuel Martino; Pablo Hernández / Christian Kawas | 2; 4 | 4^{5} 5^{7} | 3; 5 |

==== Puerto Rico vs. Trinidad and Tobago ====
Puerto Rico
3
Cuba
14 March 2001

Trinidad and Tobago
0

| | | | 1 | 2 | 3 | 4 | 5 |
|---|---|---|---|---|---|---|---|
| 1 | (Puerto Rico) (Trinidad and Tobago) | Juan Carlos Fernández; Troy Stone | 4; 1 | 4; 2 | 0; 4 | 4; 1 |
| 2 | (Puerto Rico) (Trinidad and Tobago) | Gabriel Montilla; Shane Stone | 3; 5 | 5; 3 | 0; 4 | 4; 1 | 5; 3 |
| 3 | (Puerto Rico) (Trinidad and Tobago) | Gilberto Álvarez / Ricardo Jordan; Tyler Mayers / Troy Stone | 5^{7} 4^{5} | 2; 4 | 4; 2 | 3; 5 | 4; 2 |

==== El Salvador vs. Trinidad and Tobago ====
El Salvador
1
Cuba
15 March 2001

Trinidad and Tobago
2

| | | | 1 | 2 | 3 | 4 | 5 |
|---|---|---|---|---|---|---|---|
| 1 | (El Salvador) (Trinidad and Tobago) | Manuel Antonio Tejada Ruiz; Troy Stone | 4; 0 | 4; 0 | 4; 1 |
| 2 | (El Salvador) (Trinidad and Tobago) | José Baires; Shane Stone | 0; 4 | 1; 4 | 2; 4 |
| 3 | (El Salvador) (Trinidad and Tobago) | Rafael Fuentes / Samuel Martino; Shane Stone / Troy Stone | 2; 4 | 2; 4 | 4^{5} 5^{7} |

==== Honduras vs. Puerto Rico ====
Honduras
2
Cuba
15 March 2001

Puerto Rico
1

| | | | 1 | 2 | 3 | 4 | 5 |
|---|---|---|---|---|---|---|---|
| 1 | (Honduras) (Puerto Rico) | Calton Álvarez; Juan Carlos Fernández | 4; 0 | 4; 2 | 2; 4 | 4; 2 |
| 2 | (Honduras) (Puerto Rico) | Carlos Cáceres; Gabriel Montilla | 4^{2} 5^{7} | 2; 4 | 2; 4 |
| 3 | (Honduras) (Puerto Rico) | Carlos Cáceres / Christian Kawas; Ricardo Jordan / Gabriel Montilla | 4^{5} 5^{7} | 5^{7} 4^{3} | 5^{7} 4^{3} | 0; 4 | 4; 2 |

==== El Salvador vs. Puerto Rico ====
El Salvador
2
Cuba
16 March 2001

Puerto Rico
1

| | | | 1 | 2 | 3 | 4 | 5 |
|---|---|---|---|---|---|---|---|
| 1 | (El Salvador) (Puerto Rico) | Manuel Antonio Tejada Ruiz; Gilberto Álvarez | 5; 3 | 4^{6} 5^{8} | 4; 1 | 1; 4 | 4; 1 |
| 2 | (El Salvador) (Puerto Rico) | José Baires; Gabriel Montilla | 5; 3 | 1; 4 | 4^{4} 5^{7} | 4; 2 | 4; 0 |
| 3 | (El Salvador) (Puerto Rico) | Rafael Fuentes / Samuel Martino; Juan Carlos Fernández / Ricardo Jordan | 4; 2 | 5^{7} 4^{5} | 0; 4 | 3; 5 | 3; 5 |

==== Honduras vs. Trinidad and Tobago ====
Honduras
1
Cuba
16 March 2001

Trinidad and Tobago
2

| | | | 1 | 2 | 3 | 4 | 5 |
|---|---|---|---|---|---|---|---|
| 1 | (Honduras) (Trinidad and Tobago) | Pablo Hernández; Tyler Mayers | 2; 4 | 0; 4 | 1; 4 |
| 2 | (Honduras) (Trinidad and Tobago) | Carlos Cáceres; Shane Stone | 4; 0 | 0; 4 | 5^{7} 4^{1} | 4; 0 |
| 3 | (Honduras) (Trinidad and Tobago) | Carlos Cáceres / Christian Kawas; Shane Stone / Troy Stone | 2; 4 | 0; 4 | 2; 4 |

=== Group B ===
==== Bermuda vs. Cuba ====
Bermuda
0
Cuba
14 March 2001

Cuba
3

| | | | 1 | 2 | 3 | 4 | 5 |
|---|---|---|---|---|---|---|---|
| 1 | (Bermuda) (Cuba) | James Collieson; Ricardo Chile Fonte | 0; 4 | 1; 4 | 0; 4 |
| 2 | (Bermuda) (Cuba) | Donald Evans; Lázaro Navarro-Batles | 1; 4 | 0; 4 | 2; 4 |
| 3 | (Bermuda) (Cuba) | Jenson Bascome / Richard Mallory; Sandor Martínez Breijo / Lázaro Navarro-Batles | 5^{7} 4^{5} | 2; 4 | 4; 1 | 1; 4 | 0; 4 |

==== Bolivia vs. Jamaica ====
Bolivia
0
Cuba
14 March 2001

Jamaica
3

| | | | 1 | 2 | 3 | 4 | 5 |
|---|---|---|---|---|---|---|---|
| 1 | (Bolivia) (Jamaica) | Rodrigo Navarro; Scott Willinsky | 0; 4 | 2; 4 | 2; 4 |
| 2 | (Bolivia) (Jamaica) | Diego Camacho; Jermaine Smith | 1; 4 | 0; 4 | 2; 4 |
| 3 | (Bolivia) (Jamaica) | Diego Camacho / Rodrigo Navarro; Nakia Gordon / Jermaine Smith | 3; 5 | 4; 2 | 1; 4 | 1; 4 |

==== Bermuda vs. Jamaica ====
Bermuda
0
Cuba
15 March 2001

Jamaica
3

| | | | 1 | 2 | 3 | 4 | 5 |
|---|---|---|---|---|---|---|---|
| 1 | (Bermuda) (Jamaica) | James Collieson; Nakia Gordon | 4; 2 | 1; 4 | 4; 1 | 0; 4 | 4; 6 |
| 2 | (Bermuda) (Jamaica) | Donald Evans; Scott Willinsky | 2; 4 | 3; 5 | 2; 4 |
| 3 | (Bermuda) (Jamaica) | Jenson Bascome / Richard Mallory; Elvis Henry / Jermaine Smith | 5^{7} 4^{5} | 2; 4 | 1; 4 | 4^{4} 5^{7} |

==== Bolivia vs. Cuba ====
Bolivia
0
Cuba
15 March 2001

Cuba
3

| | | | 1 | 2 | 3 | 4 | 5 |
|---|---|---|---|---|---|---|---|
| 1 | (Bolivia) (Cuba) | Rodrigo Navarro; Ricardo Chile Fonte | 2; 4 | 4^{7} 5^{9} | 1; 4 |
| 2 | (Bolivia) (Cuba) | Diego Camacho; Lázaro Navarro-Batles | 3; 5 | 3; 5 | 1; 4 |
| 3 | (Bolivia) (Cuba) | Mario Arce / Rodrigo Navarro; José Antonio Cobas Martínez / Sandor Martínez Breijo | 4^{3} 5^{7} | 2; 4 | 4^{3} 5^{7} |

==== Bermuda vs. Bolivia ====
Bermuda
1
Cuba
16 March 2001

Bolivia
2

| | | | 1 | 2 | 3 | 4 | 5 |
|---|---|---|---|---|---|---|---|
| 1 | (Bermuda) (Bolivia) | Jenson Bascome; Rodrigo Navarro | 0; 4 | 3; 5 | 4; 1 | 0; 4 |
| 2 | (Bermuda) (Bolivia) | James Collieson; Diego Camacho | 2; 4 | 4; 2 | 0; 4 | 1; 4 |
| 3 | (Bermuda) (Bolivia) | Donald Evans / Richard Mallory; Mario Arce / Diego Camacho | 1; 4 | 5^{7} 4^{0} | 5^{7} 4^{2} | 4; 2 |

==== Cuba vs. Jamaica ====
Cuba
2
Cuba
16 March 2001

Jamaica
1

| | | | 1 | 2 | 3 | 4 | 5 |
|---|---|---|---|---|---|---|---|
| 1 | (Cuba) (Jamaica) | José Antonio Cobas Martínez; Scott Willinsky | 0; 4 | 5; 3 | 4^{3} 5^{7} | 1; 4 |
| 2 | (Cuba) (Jamaica) | Lázaro Navarro-Batles; Jermaine Smith | 2; 4 | 4; 2 | 4; 2 | 4; 0 |
| 3 | (Cuba) (Jamaica) | Sandor Martínez Breijo / Lázaro Navarro-Batles; Jermaine Smith / Scott Willinsky | 5^{7} 4^{4} | 4; 1 | 5^{7} 4^{4} |

== 1st to 4th place play-offs ==
=== Semifinals ===
==== Trinidad and Tobago vs. Jamaica ====
Trinidad and Tobago
3
Cuba
17 March 2001

Jamaica
0

| | | | 1 | 2 | 3 | 4 | 5 |
|---|---|---|---|---|---|---|---|
| 1 | (Trinidad and Tobago) (Jamaica) | Tyler Mayers; Scott Willinsky | 4; 2 | 5^{12} 4^{10} | 4; 2 |
| 2 | (Trinidad and Tobago) (Jamaica) | Shane Stone; Jermaine Smith | 5; 3 | 4^{2} 5^{7} | 5^{7} 4^{1} | 3; 5 | 4; 2 |
| 3 | (Trinidad and Tobago) (Jamaica) | Ivor Grazette / Tyler Mayers; Nakia Gordon / Elvis Henry | 1; 4 | 5; 3 | 5^{8} 4^{6} | 4; 2 |

==== Cuba vs. El Salvador ====
Cuba
2
Cuba
17 March 2001

El Salvador
1

| | | | 1 | 2 | 3 | 4 | 5 |
|---|---|---|---|---|---|---|---|
| 1 | (Cuba) (El Salvador) | Ricardo Chile Fonte; Manuel Antonio Tejada Ruiz | 0; 4 | 5^{7} 4^{2} | 4; 2 | 1; 4 | 1; 4 |
| 2 | (Cuba) (El Salvador) | Lázaro Navarro-Batles; José Baires | 4; 2 | 4; 0 | 4; 0 |
| 3 | (Cuba) (El Salvador) | Sandor Martínez Breijo / Lázaro Navarro-Batles; José Baires / Rafael Fuentes | 5; 3 | 4; 0 | 4; 1 |

=== Final ===
==== Trinidad and Tobago vs. Cuba ====
Trinidad and Tobago
0
Cuba
18 March 2001

Cuba
2

| | | | 1 | 2 | 3 | 4 | 5 |
|---|---|---|---|---|---|---|---|---|
| 1 | (Trinidad and Tobago) (Cuba) | Tyler Mayers; José Antonio Cobas Martínez | 4; 2 | 2; 4 | 1; 4 | 0; 4 |
| 2 | (Trinidad and Tobago) (Cuba) | Shane Stone; Lázaro Navarro-Batles | 2; 4 | 1; 4 | 2; 4 |
| 3 | (Trinidad and Tobago) (Cuba) | Tyler Mayers / Shane Stone; José Antonio Cobas Martínez / Lázaro Navarro-Batles | | | | | | not played |

=== 3rd to 4th play-off ===
==== Jamaica vs. El Salvador ====
Jamaica
2
Cuba
18 March 2001

El Salvador
1

| | | | 1 | 2 | 3 | 4 | 5 |
|---|---|---|---|---|---|---|---|
| 1 | (Jamaica) (El Salvador) | Nakia Gordon; Manuel Antonio Tejada Ruiz | 4; 1 | 0; 4 | 0; 4 | 2; 4 |
| 2 | (Jamaica) (El Salvador) | Jermaine Smith; José Baires | 4^{3} 5^{7} | 5^{7} 4^{4} | 1; 4 | 5; 3 | 4; 2 |
| 3 | (Jamaica) (El Salvador) | Nakia Gordon / Scott Willinsky; José Baires / Rafael Fuentes | 4; 2 | 4; 1 | 5^{7} 4^{1} |

== 5th to 8th place play-offs ==
=== 5th to 8th play-offs ===
==== Honduras vs. Bermuda ====
Honduras
3
Cuba
17 March 2001

Bermuda
0

| | | | 1 | 2 | 3 | 4 | 5 |
|---|---|---|---|---|---|---|---|
| 1 | (Honduras) (Bermuda) | Calton Álvarez; James Collieson | 4; 2 | 4^{4} 5^{7} | 4; 0 | 4; 1 |
| 2 | (Honduras) (Bermuda) | Carlos Cáceres; Donald Evans | 5^{7} 4^{2} | 1; 4 | 4; 2 | 4; 1 |
| 3 | (Honduras) (Bermuda) | Pablo Hernández / Christian Kawas; Jenson Bascome / Richard Mallory | 4; 1 | 4; 2 | 4; 0 |

==== Bolivia vs. Puerto Rico ====
Bolivia
1
Cuba
17 March 2001

Puerto Rico
2

| | | | 1 | 2 | 3 | 4 | 5 |
|---|---|---|---|---|---|---|---|
| 1 | (Bolivia) (Puerto Rico) | Rodrigo Navarro; Gilberto Álvarez | 4; 0 | 4; 0 | 4; 0 |
| 2 | (Bolivia) (Puerto Rico) | Diego Camacho; Gabriel Montilla | 4^{1} 5^{7} | 4; 2 | 1; 4 | 2; 4 |
| 3 | (Bolivia) (Puerto Rico) | Diego Camacho / Rodrigo Navarro; Ricardo Jordan / Gabriel Montilla | 2; 4 | 4; 0 | 2; 4 | 2; 4 |

=== 5th to 6th play-off ===
==== Honduras vs. Puerto Rico ====
Honduras
2
Cuba
18 March 2001

Puerto Rico
0

| | | | 1 | 2 | 3 | 4 | 5 |
|---|---|---|---|---|---|---|---|---|
| 1 | (Honduras) (Puerto Rico) | Calton Álvarez; Gilberto Álvarez | 4; 1 | 4; 0 | 4; 2 |
| 2 | (Honduras) (Puerto Rico) | Carlos Cáceres; Juan Carlos Fernández | 2; 4 | 1; 4 | 4; 2 | 4; 2 | 4; 1 |
| 3 | (Honduras) (Puerto Rico) | Calton Álvarez / Carlos Cáceres; Gilberto Álvarez / Juan Carlos Fernández | | | | | | not played |

=== 7th to 8th play-off ===
==== Bermuda vs. Bolivia ====
Bermuda
0
Cuba
18 March 2001

Bolivia
2

| | | | 1 | 2 | 3 | 4 | 5 |
|---|---|---|---|---|---|---|---|---|
| 1 | (Bermuda) (Bolivia) | Jenson Bascome; Rodrigo Navarro | 2; 4 | 1; 4 | 2; 4 |
| 2 | (Bermuda) (Bolivia) | James Collieson; Diego Camacho | 3; 5 | 2; 4 | 2; 4 |
| 3 | (Bermuda) (Bolivia) | Jenson Bascome / James Collieson; Diego Camacho / Rodrigo Navarro | | | | | | not played |
