= 2003 Davis Cup Americas Zone Group III =

International tennis competition

The Group III tournament was held in the Week commencing March 31, in Port of Spain, Trinidad and Tobago, on outdoor hard courts.

== Format ==
The eight teams were split into two groups and played in a round-robin format. The top two teams of each group advanced to the promotion pool, from which the two top teams were promoted to the Americas Zone Group II in 2004. The bottom two teams of each group were placed in the relegation pool, from which the two bottom teams were demoted to the Americas Zone Group IV in 2004.

== Pool A ==
Team	Pld	W	L	MF	MA
Jamaica	3	3	0	7	2
Bolivia	3	2	1	6	3
Guatemala	3	1	2	5	4
Saint Lucia	3	0	3	0	9

=== Guatemala vs. Saint Lucia ===
Guatemala
3
Jean Pierre Complex, Port of Spain, Trinidad and Tobago
31 March 2003

Saint Lucia
0

			1	2	3
1	(Guatemala) (Saint Lucia)	Walter Barahona; Vernon Lewis	6; 3	4; 6	7; 5
2	(Guatemala) (Saint Lucia)	Rodrigo Gabriel; Sirsean Arlain	6; 1	6; 2
3	(Guatemala) (Saint Lucia)	Cristian Paiz / Jorge Tejada; Vernon Lewis / Yves Sinson	6; 3	6; 3

=== Jamaica vs. Bolivia ===
Jamaica
2
Jean Pierre Complex, Port of Spain, Trinidad and Tobago
31 March 2003

Bolivia
1

			1	2	3
1	(Jamaica) (Bolivia)	Dustin Brown; Alberto Sottocorno	7^{7} 6^{3}	4; 6	6; 3
2	(Jamaica) (Bolivia)	Ryan Russell; Javier Taborga	6; 4	6; 2
3	(Jamaica) (Bolivia)	Nakia Gordon / Ryan Russell; Alberto Sottocorno / Javier Taborga	6; 2	3; 6	4; 6

=== Guatemala vs. Bolivia ===
Guatemala
1
Jean Pierre Complex, Port of Spain, Trinidad and Tobago
1 April 2003

Bolivia
2

			1	2	3
1	(Guatemala) (Bolivia)	Cristian Paiz; Alberto Sottocorno	7; 5	6; 3
2	(Guatemala) (Bolivia)	Rodrigo Gabriel; Javier Taborga	2; 6	6^{5} 7^{7}
3	(Guatemala) (Bolivia)	Cristian Paiz / Jorge Tejada; Alberto Sottocorno / Javier Taborga	6^{4} 7^{7}	3; 6

=== Jamaica vs. Saint Lucia ===
Jamaica
3
Jean Pierre Complex, Port of Spain, Trinidad and Tobago
1 April 2003

Saint Lucia
0

			1	2	3
1	(Jamaica) (Saint Lucia)	Dustin Brown; Vernon Lewis	6; 4	6; 3
2	(Jamaica) (Saint Lucia)	Ryan Russell; Sirsean Arlain	6; 1	6; 2
3	(Jamaica) (Saint Lucia)	Dustin Brown / Ryan Russell; Vernon Lewis / Yves Sinson	6; 1	6; 2

=== Guatemala vs. Jamaica ===
Guatemala
1
Jean Pierre Complex, Port of Spain, Trinidad and Tobago
2 April 2003

Jamaica
2

			1	2	3
1	(Guatemala) (Jamaica)	Cristian Paiz; Dustin Brown	6; 3	7^{7} 6^{5}
2	(Guatemala) (Jamaica)	Rodrigo Gabriel; Ryan Russell	2; 6	2; 6
3	(Guatemala) (Jamaica)	Cristian Paiz / Jorge Tejada; Dustin Brown / Ryan Russell	5; 7	7^{8} 6^{6}	1; 6

=== Bolivia vs. Saint Lucia ===
Bolivia
3
Jean Pierre Complex, Port of Spain, Trinidad and Tobago
2 April 2003

Saint Lucia
0

			1	2	3
1	(Bolivia) (Saint Lucia)	Alberto Sottocorno; Vernon Lewis	7; 5	6; 3
2	(Bolivia) (Saint Lucia)	Javier Taborga; Sirsean Arlain	6; 0	6; 1
3	(Bolivia) (Saint Lucia)	Diego Camacho / Javier Taborga; Alberton Richelieu / Yves Sinson	6; 3	6; 2

== Pool B ==
Team	Pld	W	L	MF	MA
Puerto Rico	3	3	0	8	1
El Salvador	3	2	1	6	3
Trinidad and Tobago	3	1	2	2	7
Honduras	3	0	3	2	7

=== Puerto Rico vs. Trinidad and Tobago ===
Puerto Rico
3
Jean Pierre Complex, Port of Spain, Trinidad and Tobago
31 March 2003

Trinidad and Tobago
0

			1	2	3
1	(Puerto Rico) (Trinidad and Tobago)	Luis Haddock; Troy Stone	6; 1	6; 2
2	(Puerto Rico) (Trinidad and Tobago)	Gabriel Montilla; Shane Stone	6; 3	4; 6	6; 2
3	(Puerto Rico) (Trinidad and Tobago)	Gilberto Álvarez / Gabriel Montilla; Shane Stone / Troy Stone	7^{7} 6^{4}	6; 4

=== Honduras vs. El Salvador ===
Honduras
0
Jean Pierre Complex, Port of Spain, Trinidad and Tobago
31 March 2003

El Salvador
3

			1	2	3
1	(Honduras) (El Salvador)	Calton Álvarez; Jaime Cuellar	1; 6	0; 6
2	(Honduras) (El Salvador)	Carlos Cáceres; Rafael Arévalo	4; 6	6; 3	4; 6
3	(Honduras) (El Salvador)	Francklin García / Pablo Hernández; José Baires / Augusto Sanabria	3; 6	6^{3} 7^{7}

=== Puerto Rico vs. El Salvador ===
Puerto Rico
3
Jean Pierre Complex, Port of Spain, Trinidad and Tobago
1 April 2003

El Salvador
0

			1	2	3
1	(Puerto Rico) (El Salvador)	Luis Haddock; Jaime Cuellar	6^{1} 7^{7}	6; 2	6; 4
2	(Puerto Rico) (El Salvador)	Gabriel Montilla; Rafael Arévalo	6; 1	6; 4
3	(Puerto Rico) (El Salvador)	Gilberto Álvarez / Gabriel Montilla; José Baires / Augusto Sanabria	6; 3	6; 4

=== Honduras vs. Trinidad and Tobago ===
Honduras
1
Jean Pierre Complex, Port of Spain, Trinidad and Tobago
1 April 2003

Trinidad and Tobago
2

			1	2	3
1	(Honduras) (Trinidad and Tobago)	Calton Álvarez; Shane Stone	4; 6	4; 6
2	(Honduras) (Trinidad and Tobago)	Carlos Cáceres; Ivor Grazette	4; 6	6; 4	6; 1
3	(Honduras) (Trinidad and Tobago)	Carlos Cáceres / Pablo Hernández; Shane Stone / Troy Stone	4; 6	6^{0} 7^{7}

=== Puerto Rico vs. Honduras ===
Puerto Rico
2
Jean Pierre Complex, Port of Spain, Trinidad and Tobago
2 April 2003

Honduras
1

			1	2	3
1	(Puerto Rico) (Honduras)	Gilberto Álvarez; Francklin García	6; 3	6; 4
2	(Puerto Rico) (Honduras)	Luis Haddock; Pablo Hernández	6; 2	0; 6	2; 6
3	(Puerto Rico) (Honduras)	Gilberto Álvarez / Gabriel Montilla; Carlos Cáceres / Francklin García	6; 2	5; 7	6; 2

=== El Salvador vs. Trinidad and Tobago ===
El Salvador
3
Jean Pierre Complex, Port of Spain, Trinidad and Tobago
2 April 2003

Trinidad and Tobago
0

			1	2	3
1	(El Salvador) (Trinidad and Tobago)	Jaime Cuellar; Shane Stone	6; 2	6; 1
2	(El Salvador) (Trinidad and Tobago)	Rafael Arévalo; Ivor Grazette	6; 3	6; 3
3	(El Salvador) (Trinidad and Tobago)	José Baires / Augusto Sanabria; Ivor Grazette / Dexter Mahase	6; 2	6; 2

== Promotion pool ==
The top two teams from each of Pools A and B advanced to the Promotion pool. Results and points from games against the opponent from the preliminary round were carried forward.

Team	Pld	W	L	MF	MA
Jamaica	3	3	0	7	2
Puerto Rico	3	2	1	6	3
El Salvador	3	1	2	3	6
Bolivia	3	0	3	2	7

Jamaica and Puerto Rico promoted to Group II for 2004.

=== Puerto Rico vs. Bolivia ===
Puerto Rico
2
Jean Pierre Complex, Port of Spain, Trinidad and Tobago
3 April 2003

Bolivia
1

			1	2	3
1	(Puerto Rico) (Bolivia)	Luis Haddock; Alberto Sottocorno	7^{7} 6^{3}	6; 2
2	(Puerto Rico) (Bolivia)	Gabriel Montilla; Javier Taborga	6^{5} 7^{7}	7; 5	6; 4
3	(Puerto Rico) (Bolivia)	Gilberto Álvarez / Jan-Lewis Polhamus; Diego Camacho / Alberto Sottocorno	6; 4	1; 6	4; 6

=== Jamaica vs. El Salvador ===
Jamaica
3
Jean Pierre Complex, Port of Spain, Trinidad and Tobago
3 April 2003

El Salvador
0

			1	2	3
1	(Jamaica) (El Salvador)	Dustin Brown; Jaime Cuellar	6; 4	6; 4
2	(Jamaica) (El Salvador)	Ryan Russell; Rafael Arévalo	6; 2	6; 1
3	(Jamaica) (El Salvador)	Dustin Brown / Ryan Russell; José Baires / Augusto Sanabria	6; 1	6; 3

=== Puerto Rico vs. Jamaica ===
Puerto Rico
1
Jean Pierre Complex, Port of Spain, Trinidad and Tobago
4 April 2003

Jamaica
2

			1	2	3
1	(Puerto Rico) (Jamaica)	Jan-Lewis Polhamus; Damar Johnson	6; 2	0; 1		retired
2	(Puerto Rico) (Jamaica)	Gilberto Álvarez; Dustin Brown	2; 6	0; 6
3	(Puerto Rico) (Jamaica)	Gilberto Álvarez / Gabriel Montilla; Nakia Gordon / Damar Johnson	7; 5	6; 2

=== Bolivia vs. El Salvador ===
Bolivia
0
Jean Pierre Complex, Port of Spain, Trinidad and Tobago
4 April 2003

El Salvador
3

			1	2	3
1	(Bolivia) (El Salvador)	Diego Camacho; Jaime Cuellar	7; 5	3; 6	3; 6
2	(Bolivia) (El Salvador)	Alberto Sottocorno; Rafael Arévalo	1; 6	4; 6
3	(Bolivia) (El Salvador)	Ramiro Benavides / Javier Taborga; José Baires / Augusto Sanabria	6; 2	0; 6	3; 6

== Relegation pool ==
The bottom two teams from Pools A and B were placed in the relegation group. Results and points from games against the opponent from the preliminary round were carried forward.

Team	Pld	W	L	MF	MA
Honduras	3	2	1	7	2
Trinidad and Tobago	3	2	1	6	3
Guatemala	3	2	1	5	4
Saint Lucia	3	0	3	0	9

Guatemala and St.Lucia demoted to Group IV for 2004.

=== Guatemala vs. Honduras ===
Guatemala
0
Jean Pierre Complex, Port of Spain, Trinidad and Tobago
3 April 2003

Honduras
3

			1	2	3
1	(Guatemala) (Honduras)	Cristian Paiz; Pablo Hernández	6^{5} 7^{7}	1; 6
2	(Guatemala) (Honduras)	Rodrigo Gabriel; Carlos Cáceres	6; 4	6^{3} 7^{7}	0; 6
3	(Guatemala) (Honduras)	Walter Barahona / Jorge Tejada; Carlos Cáceres / Pablo Hernández	2; 6	3; 6

=== Trinidad and Tobago vs. Saint Lucia ===
Trinidad and Tobago
3
Jean Pierre Complex, Port of Spain, Trinidad and Tobago
3 April 2003

Saint Lucia
0

			1	2	3
1	(Trinidad and Tobago) (Saint Lucia)	Shane Stone; Yves Sinson	6; 2	6; 1
2	(Trinidad and Tobago) (Saint Lucia)	Ivor Grazette; Vernon Lewis	7; 5	6; 1
3	(Trinidad and Tobago) (Saint Lucia)	Shane Stone / Troy Stone; Alberton Richelieu / Yves Sinson	6; 4	3; 6	7; 5

=== Guatemala vs. Trinidad and Tobago ===
Guatemala
2
Jean Pierre Complex, Port of Spain, Trinidad and Tobago
4 April 2003

Trinidad and Tobago
1

			1	2	3
1	(Guatemala) (Trinidad and Tobago)	Cristian Paiz; Shane Stone	3; 6	6; 4	6; 4
2	(Guatemala) (Trinidad and Tobago)	Rodrigo Gabriel; Ivor Grazette	7; 5	6; 3
3	(Guatemala) (Trinidad and Tobago)	Rodrigo Gabriel / Cristian Paiz; Shane Stone / Troy Stone	4; 6	5; 7

=== Honduras vs. Saint Lucia ===
Honduras
3
Jean Pierre Complex, Port of Spain, Trinidad and Tobago
4 April 2003

Saint Lucia
0

			1	2	3
1	(Honduras) (Saint Lucia)	Pablo Hernández; Alberton Richelieu	6; 0	6; 1
2	(Honduras) (Saint Lucia)	Carlos Cáceres; Yves Sinson	6; 2	6; 4
3	(Honduras) (Saint Lucia)	Carlos Cáceres / Pablo Hernández; Sirsean Arlain / Alberton Richelieu	6; 3	6; 1

== Final standings ==
Rank	Team
1	Jamaica
2	Puerto Rico
3	El Salvador
4	Bolivia
5	Honduras
6	Trinidad and Tobago
7	Guatemala
8	Saint Lucia

- Jamaica and Puerto Rico promoted to Group II in 2004.
- Guatemala and Saint Lucia relegated to Group IV in 2004.
