= 1995 Davis Cup Americas Zone Group III =

International tennis competition

The Americas Zone was one of the three zones of the regional Davis Cup competition in 1995.

In the Americas Zone there were three different tiers, called groups, in which teams competed against each other to advance to the upper tier. Winners in Group III advanced to the Americas Zone Group II in 1996. All other teams remained in Group III.

== Participating nations ==
- Barbados
- Bermuda
- Costa Rica
- Dominican Republic
- Eastern Caribbean
- El Salvador
- Jamaica
- Puerto Rico
- Trinidad and Tobago

=== Draw ===
- Venue: Santo Domingo Tennis Club, Santo Domingo, Dominican Republic
- Date: 1–5 March

Group A

	PUR	DOM	CRC	ECA	BER	RR; W–L	Match; W–L	Set; W–L	Standings
Puerto Rico		2–1	3–0	2–1	3–0	4–0	10–2 (83%)	21–8 (72%)	1
Dominican Republic	1–2		2–1	2–1	3–0	3–1	8–4 (67%)	18–9 (67%)	2
Costa Rica	0–3	1–2		2–1	3–0	2–2	6–6 (50%)	15–15 (50%)	3
Eastern Caribbean	1–2	1–2	1–2		3–0	1–3	6–6 (50%)	13–15 (46%)	4
Bermuda	0–3	0–3	0–3	0–3		0–4	0–12 (0%)	4–24 (14%)	5

Group B

	BAR	ESA	JAM	TRI	RR; W–L	Match; W–L	Set; W–L	Standings
Barbados		3–0	2–1	3–0	3–0	8–1 (89%)	17–3 (85%)	1
El Salvador	0–3		3–0	3–0	2–1	6–3 (67%)	12–6 (67%)	2
Jamaica	1–2	0–3		2–1	1–2	3–6 (33%)	7–13 (35%)	3
Trinidad and Tobago	0–3	0–3	1–2		0–3	1–8 (11%)	2–16 (11%)	4

- Puerto Rico and Barbados promoted to Group II in 1996.

== Group A ==
=== Dominican Republic vs. Puerto Rico ===
Dominican Republic
1
Santo Domingo Tennis Club, Santo Domingo, Dominican Republic
1 March 1995

Puerto Rico
2

			1	2	3
1	(Dominican Republic) (Puerto Rico)	Genaro Deleon; Jean Paul Vissepó	4; 6	6; 1	6; 0
2	(Dominican Republic) (Puerto Rico)	Rodrigo Vallejo; Jorge González	7^{7} 6^{3}	5; 7	2; 5	retired
3	(Dominican Republic) (Puerto Rico)	Genaro Deleon / Hiram Silfa; Jorge González / Rafael Jordan	4; 6	4; 6

=== Bermuda vs. Eastern Caribbean ===
Bermuda
0
Santo Domingo Tennis Club, Santo Domingo, Dominican Republic
1 March 1995

Eastern Caribbean
3

			1	2	3
1	(Bermuda) (Eastern Caribbean)	Donald Evans; Vernon Lewis	3; 6	6; 4	4; 6
2	(Bermuda) (Eastern Caribbean)	Michael Way; Gavaskar Williams	2; 6	2; 6
3	(Bermuda) (Eastern Caribbean)	Stephen Bean / William Way; John Maginley / Henri Sinson	6^{6} 7^{8}	4; 6

=== Dominican Republic vs. Costa Rica ===
Dominican Republic
2
Santo Domingo Tennis Club, Santo Domingo, Dominican Republic
2 March 1995

Costa Rica
1

			1	2	3
1	(Dominican Republic) (Costa Rica)	Genaro Deleon; Rafael Ávalos Brenes	6; 4	6; 3
2	(Dominican Republic) (Costa Rica)	Sixto Camacho; Kenneth Thome Bolanos	7^{7} 6^{5}	4; 6	2; 2	retired
3	(Dominican Republic) (Costa Rica)	Genaro Deleon / Hiram Silfa; Rafael Ávalos Brenes / Kenneth Thome Bolanos	6; 4	6^{6} 7^{8}	6; 3

=== Eastern Caribbean vs. Puerto Rico ===
Eastern Caribbean
1
Santo Domingo Tennis Club, Santo Domingo, Dominican Republic
2 March 1995

Puerto Rico
2

			1	2	3
1	(Eastern Caribbean) (Puerto Rico)	Vernon Lewis; Rafael Jordan	4; 6	2; 6
2	(Eastern Caribbean) (Puerto Rico)	Gavaskar Williams; Jorge González	6; 4	3; 6	6; 3
3	(Eastern Caribbean) (Puerto Rico)	John Maginley / Gavaskar Williams; Jorge González / Rafael Jordan	2; 6	5; 7

=== Bermuda vs. Puerto Rico ===
Bermuda
0
Santo Domingo Tennis Club, Santo Domingo, Dominican Republic
3 March 1995

Puerto Rico
3

			1	2	3
1	(Bermuda) (Puerto Rico)	Donald Evans; Rafael Jordan	3; 6	7; 5	4; 6
2	(Bermuda) (Puerto Rico)	Michael Way; Jorge González	3; 6	3; 6
3	(Bermuda) (Puerto Rico)	Stephen Bean / William Way; Manuel Ortiz / Jean Paul Vissepó	1; 6	2; 6

=== Costa Rica vs. Eastern Caribbean ===
Costa Rica
2
Santo Domingo Tennis Club, Santo Domingo, Dominican Republic
3 March 1995

Eastern Caribbean
1

			1	2	3
1	(Costa Rica) (Eastern Caribbean)	Fabrizio Golfin Guevara; Henri Sinson	6; 2	6; 0
2	(Costa Rica) (Eastern Caribbean)	Rafael Ávalos Brenes; Gavaskar Williams	6; 2	4; 6	6; 8
3	(Costa Rica) (Eastern Caribbean)	Rafael Ávalos Brenes / Kenneth Thome Bolanos; John Maginley / Henri Sinson	6; 4	1; 6	6; 1

=== Dominican Republic vs. Eastern Caribbean ===
Dominican Republic
2
Santo Domingo Tennis Club, Santo Domingo, Dominican Republic
4 March 1995

Eastern Caribbean
1

			1	2	3
1	(Dominican Republic) (Eastern Caribbean)	Genaro Deleon; Vernon Lewis	7; 5	6; 0
2	(Dominican Republic) (Eastern Caribbean)	Hiram Silfa; Gavaskar Williams	6^{4} 7^{7}	3; 6
3	(Dominican Republic) (Eastern Caribbean)	Genaro Deleon / Hiram Silfa; John Maginley / Gavaskar Williams	7^{9} 6^{7}	6; 2

=== Bermuda vs. Costa Rica ===
Bermuda
0
Santo Domingo Tennis Club, Santo Domingo, Dominican Republic
4 March 1995

Costa Rica
3

			1	2	3
1	(Bermuda) (Costa Rica)	Donald Evans; Fabrizio Golfin Guevara	7^{7} 6^{5}	3; 6	4; 6
2	(Bermuda) (Costa Rica)	Michael Way; Kenneth Thome Bolanos	2; 6	1; 6
3	(Bermuda) (Costa Rica)	Donald Evans / Michael Way; Rafael Ávalos Brenes / Kenneth Thome Bolanos	4; 6	3; 6

=== Dominican Republic vs. Bermuda ===
Dominican Republic
3
Santo Domingo Tennis Club, Santo Domingo, Dominican Republic
5 March 1995

Bermuda
0

			1	2	3
1	(Dominican Republic) (Bermuda)	Genaro Deleon; Donald Evans	6; 0	6; 1
2	(Dominican Republic) (Bermuda)	Hiram Silfa; Michael Way	6^{7} 7^{9}	6; 4	6; 1
3	(Dominican Republic) (Bermuda)	Genaro Deleon / Hiram Silfa; Donald Evans / William Way	6; 2	6; 4

=== Costa Rica vs. Puerto Rico ===
Costa Rica
0
Santo Domingo Tennis Club, Santo Domingo, Dominican Republic
5 March 1995

Puerto Rico
3

			1	2	3
1	(Costa Rica) (Puerto Rico)	Fabrizio Golfin Guevara; Rafael Jordan	6; 4	1; 6	2; 6
2	(Costa Rica) (Puerto Rico)	Rafael Ávalos Brenes; Jorge González	7^{7} 6^{5}	4; 6	4; 6
3	(Costa Rica) (Puerto Rico)	Fabrizio Golfin Guevara / Bernardo Rojas Montero; Manuel Ortiz / Jean Paul Vissepó	1; 6	2; 6

== Group B ==
=== Barbados vs. El Salvador ===
Barbados
3
Santo Domingo Tennis Club, Santo Domingo, Dominican Republic
3 March 1995

El Salvador
0

			1	2	3
1	(Barbados) (El Salvador)	Richard Ashby; Manuel Antonio Tejada Ruiz	6; 3	6; 4
2	(Barbados) (El Salvador)	Martin Blackman; Miguel Merz	6; 4	6; 3
3	(Barbados) (El Salvador)	Richard Ashby / Martin Blackman; Miguel Merz / Manuel Antonio Tejada Ruiz	6; 4	6; 4

=== Jamaica vs. Trinidad and Tobago ===
Jamaica
2
Santo Domingo Tennis Club, Santo Domingo, Dominican Republic
3 March 1995

Trinidad and Tobago
1

			1	2	3
1	(Jamaica) (Trinidad and Tobago)	Karl Hale; Shane Stone	6; 4	6; 2
2	(Jamaica) (Trinidad and Tobago)	Nicholas Malcolm; Orville Adams	2; 6	3; 6
3	(Jamaica) (Trinidad and Tobago)	Doug Burke / Karl Hale; Orville Adams / Shane Stone	6; 3	6; 1

=== Barbados vs. Jamaica ===
Barbados
2
Santo Domingo Tennis Club, Santo Domingo, Dominican Republic
4 March 1995

Jamaica
1

			1	2	3
1	(Barbados) (Jamaica)	Richard Ashby; Karl Hale	6; 4	6^{7} 7^{9}	4; 6
2	(Barbados) (Jamaica)	Martin Blackman; Scott Willinsky	6; 3	6; 2
3	(Barbados) (Jamaica)	Richard Ashby / Martin Blackman; Doug Burke / Karl Hale	6; 4	1; 6	6; 3

=== El Salvador vs. Trinidad and Tobago ===
El Salvador
3
Santo Domingo Tennis Club, Santo Domingo, Dominican Republic
4 March 1995

Trinidad and Tobago
0

			1	2	3
1	(El Salvador) (Trinidad and Tobago)	Manuel Antonio Tejada Ruiz; Shane Stone	7^{7} 6^{5}	7^{7} 6^{3}
2	(El Salvador) (Trinidad and Tobago)	Miguel Merz; Orville Adams	6; 0	6; 0
3	(El Salvador) (Trinidad and Tobago)	Miguel Merz / Manuel Antonio Tejada Ruiz; Orville Adams / Shane Stone	7^{7} 6^{2}	7; 5

=== Barbados vs. Trinidad and Tobago ===
Barbados
3
Santo Domingo Tennis Club, Santo Domingo, Dominican Republic
5 March 1995

Trinidad and Tobago
0

			1	2	3
1	(Barbados) (Trinidad and Tobago)	Richard Ashby; Randy Hakim	6; 3	6; 3
2	(Barbados) (Trinidad and Tobago)	Martin Blackman; Shane Stone	6; 4	6; 2
3	(Barbados) (Trinidad and Tobago)	Bernard Frost / Duane Williams; Ivor Grazette / Randy Hakim	6; 4	7^{9} 6^{7}

=== El Salvador vs. Jamaica ===
El Salvador
3
Santo Domingo Tennis Club, Santo Domingo, Dominican Republic
5 March 1995

Jamaica
0

			1	2	3
1	(El Salvador) (Jamaica)	Manuel Antonio Tejada Ruiz; Karl Hale	7; 5	6; 4
2	(El Salvador) (Jamaica)	Miguel Merz; Scott Willinsky	6; 3	6; 1
3	(El Salvador) (Jamaica)	Miguel Merz / Manuel Antonio Tejada Ruiz; Nicholas Malcolm / Scott Willinsky	6; 2	6; 1
