= 1996 Davis Cup Americas Zone Group III =

International tennis competition

The Americas Zone was one of the three zones of the regional Davis Cup competition in 1996.

In the Americas Zone there were three different tiers, called groups, in which teams competed against each other to advance to the upper tier. Winners in Group III advanced to the Americas Zone Group II in 1997. In a move to a four-tier system, the bottom three teams were re-assigned to the new Group IV in 1997; all other teams remained in Group III.

== Participating nations ==
- Antigua and Barbuda
- Bermuda
- Bolivia
- Costa Rica
- Dominican Republic
- Eastern Caribbean
- El Salvador
- Haiti
- Jamaica
- Panama
- Trinidad and Tobago

=== Draw ===
- Venue: Maya Country Club, San Salvador, El Salvador
- Date: 6–10 March

Group A

	HAI	DOM	TRI	ATG	CRC	RR; W–L	Match; W–L	Set; W–L	Standings
Haiti		3–0	3–0	3–0	3–0	4–0	12–0 (100%)	24–1 (96%)	1
Dominican Republic	0–3		3–0	2–1	3–0	3–1	8–4 (67%)	17–9 (65%)	2
Trinidad and Tobago	0–3	0–3		2–1	2–1	2–2	4–8 (33%)	8–19 (30%)	3
Antigua and Barbuda	0–3	1–2	1–2		3–0	1–3	5–7 (42%)	11–16 (41%)	4
Costa Rica	0–3	0–3	1–2	0–3		0–4	1–11 (8%)	7–22 (24%)	5

Group B

	ESA	PAN	JAM	BOL	BER	ECA	RR; W–L	Match; W–L	Set; W–L	Standings
El Salvador		3–0	2–1	3–0	3–0	3–0	5–0	14–1 (93%)	28–3 (90%)	1
Panama	0–3		3–0	2–1	2–1	2–1	4–1	9–6 (60%)	21–14 (60%)	2
Jamaica	1–2	0–3		2–1	3–0	2–1	3–2	8–7 (53%)	17–17 (50%)	3
Bolivia	0–3	1–2	1–2		3–0	3–0	2–3	8–7 (53%)	18–15 (55%)	4
Bermuda	0–3	1–2	0–3	0–3		2–1	1–4	3–12 (20%)	8–27 (23%)	5
Eastern Caribbean	0–3	1–2	1–2	0–3	1–2		0–5	3–12 (20%)	9–25 (26%)	6

- Haiti and El Salvador promoted to Group II in 1997.
- Costa Rica, Bermuda and Eastern Caribbean assigned to Group IV in 1997.

== Group A ==
=== Costa Rica vs. Haiti ===
Costa Rica
0
Maya Country Club, San Salvador, El Salvador
6 March 1996

Haiti
3

			1	2	3
1	(Costa Rica) (Haiti)	Fabrizio Golfin Guevara; Bertrand Madsen	3; 6	2; 6
2	(Costa Rica) (Haiti)	Rafael Ávalos Brenes; Ronald Agénor	3; 6	2; 6
3	(Costa Rica) (Haiti)	Augusto Arias Venegas / Fabrizio Golfin Guevara; Bertrand Lacombe / Bertrand Madsen	1; 6	3; 6

=== Dominican Republic vs. Trinidad and Tobago ===
Dominican Republic
3
Maya Country Club, San Salvador, El Salvador
6 March 1996

Trinidad and Tobago
0

			1	2	3
1	(Dominican Republic) (Trinidad and Tobago)	Rodrigo Vallejo; Edward Campbell	6; 1	6; 1
2	(Dominican Republic) (Trinidad and Tobago)	Hiram Silfa; Simon Evelyn	6; 0	6; 3
3	(Dominican Republic) (Trinidad and Tobago)	Alejandro Aybar / Sixto Camacho; Orville Adams / Simon Evelyn	7^{7} 6^{5}	6; 3

=== Antigua and Barbuda vs. Dominican Republic ===
Antigua and Barbuda
1
Maya Country Club, San Salvador, El Salvador
7 March 1996

Dominican Republic
2

			1	2	3
1	(Antigua and Barbuda) (Dominican Republic)	Jerry Williams; Rodrigo Vallejo	4; 6	4; 6
2	(Antigua and Barbuda) (Dominican Republic)	Phil Williamson; Hiram Silfa	6; 3	6; 1
3	(Antigua and Barbuda) (Dominican Republic)	Jerry Williams / Phil Williamson; Sixto Camacho / Hiram Silfa	4; 6	5; 7

=== Costa Rica vs. Trinidad and Tobago ===
Costa Rica
1
Maya Country Club, San Salvador, El Salvador
7 March 1996

Trinidad and Tobago
2

			1	2	3
1	(Costa Rica) (Trinidad and Tobago)	Fernando Martínez Manrique; Edward Campbell	6; 2	6; 3
2	(Costa Rica) (Trinidad and Tobago)	Fabrizio Golfin Guevara; Simon Evelyn	6; 2	6^{2} 7^{7}	4; 6
3	(Costa Rica) (Trinidad and Tobago)	Augusto Arias Venegas / Rafael Ávalos Brenes; Orville Adams / Simon Evelyn	6; 3	3; 6	3; 6

=== Antigua and Barbuda vs. Trinidad and Tobago ===
Antigua and Barbuda
1
Maya Country Club, San Salvador, El Salvador
8 March 1996

Trinidad and Tobago
2

			1	2	3
1	(Antigua and Barbuda) (Trinidad and Tobago)	Jerry Williams; Orville Adams	3; 6	1; 6
2	(Antigua and Barbuda) (Trinidad and Tobago)	Phil Williamson; Simon Evelyn	6; 4	6; 2
3	(Antigua and Barbuda) (Trinidad and Tobago)	Edson Browne / Phil Williamson; Orville Adams / Simon Evelyn	4; 6	7^{8} 6^{6}	3; 6

=== Dominican Republic vs. Haiti ===
Dominican Republic
0
Maya Country Club, San Salvador, El Salvador
8 March 1996

Haiti
3

			1	2	3
1	(Dominican Republic) (Haiti)	Rodrigo Vallejo; Bertrand Madsen	5; 7	3; 6
2	(Dominican Republic) (Haiti)	Hiram Silfa; Ronald Agénor	4; 6	6; 3	5; 7
3	(Dominican Republic) (Haiti)	Alejandro Aybar / Sixto Camacho; Bertrand Lacombe / Bertrand Madsen	3; 6	3; 6

=== Antigua and Barbuda vs. Costa Rica ===
Antigua and Barbuda
3
Maya Country Club, San Salvador, El Salvador
9 March 1996

Costa Rica
0

			1	2	3
1	(Antigua and Barbuda) (Costa Rica)	Jerry Williams; Fernando Martínez Manrique	6; 1	4; 6	6; 2
2	(Antigua and Barbuda) (Costa Rica)	Phil Williamson; Rafael Ávalos Brenes	2; 6	6; 2	6; 4
3	(Antigua and Barbuda) (Costa Rica)	Fitzroy Anthony / Edson Browne; Augusto Arias Venegas / Fernando Martínez Manrique	6; 4	6; 4

=== Haiti vs. Trinidad and Tobago ===
Haiti
3
Maya Country Club, San Salvador, El Salvador
9 March 1996

Trinidad and Tobago
0

			1	2	3
1	(Haiti) (Trinidad and Tobago)	Bertrand Madsen; Orville Adams	6; 2	6; 3
2	(Haiti) (Trinidad and Tobago)	Ronald Agénor; Simon Evelyn	6; 4	6; 0
3	(Haiti) (Trinidad and Tobago)	Bertrand Lacombe / Bertrand Madsen; Edward Campbell / Ronald Greaves	6; 1	6; 3

=== Antigua and Barbuda vs. Haiti ===
Antigua and Barbuda
0
Maya Country Club, San Salvador, El Salvador
10 March 1996

Haiti
3

			1	2	3
1	(Antigua and Barbuda) (Haiti)	Jerry Williams; Bertrand Madsen	2; 6	5; 7
2	(Antigua and Barbuda) (Haiti)	Phil Williamson; Ronald Agénor	3; 6	3; 6
3	(Antigua and Barbuda) (Haiti)	Fitzroy Anthony / Edson Browne; Rafael Goscinny / Bertrand Lacombe	6^{2} 7^{7}	4; 6

=== Costa Rica vs. Dominican Republic ===
Costa Rica
0
Maya Country Club, San Salvador, El Salvador
10 March 1996

Dominican Republic
3

			1	2	3
1	(Costa Rica) (Dominican Republic)	Augusto Arias Venegas; Rodrigo Vallejo	4; 6	1; 6
2	(Costa Rica) (Dominican Republic)	Fabrizio Golfin Guevara; Hiram Silfa	4; 6	4; 6
3	(Costa Rica) (Dominican Republic)	Rafael Ávalos Brenes / Fabrizio Golfin Guevara; Alejandro Aybar / Sixto Camacho	7^{7} 6^{3}	4; 6	2; 6

== Group B ==
=== El Salvador vs. Eastern Caribbean ===
El Salvador
3
Maya Country Club, San Salvador, El Salvador
6 March 1996

Eastern Caribbean
0

			1	2	3
1	(El Salvador) (Eastern Caribbean)	Manuel Antonio Tejada Ruiz; Kane Easter	6; 2	6; 2
2	(El Salvador) (Eastern Caribbean)	Miguel Merz; Henri Sinson	6; 2	6; 0
3	(El Salvador) (Eastern Caribbean)	Miguel Merz / Manuel Antonio Tejada Ruiz; Kirt Cable / Richard Hughes	7^{7} 6^{1}	7; 5

=== Bermuda vs. Panama ===
Bermuda
1
Maya Country Club, San Salvador, El Salvador
6 March 1996

Panama
2

			1	2	3
1	(Bermuda) (Panama)	James Collieson; Juan Pablo Herrera	3; 6	4; 6
2	(Bermuda) (Panama)	Michael Way; Carlos Silva	6; 1	2; 6	6; 4
3	(Bermuda) (Panama)	Stephen Bean / Richard Mallory; Gustavo Garibaldi / Jan Gelabert	4; 6	1; 6

=== Bolivia vs. Jamaica ===
Bolivia
1
Maya Country Club, San Salvador, El Salvador
6 March 1996

Jamaica
2

			1	2	3
1	(Bolivia) (Jamaica)	Pablo Ugarte; Scott Willinsky	7; 5	6; 3
2	(Bolivia) (Jamaica)	Carlos Martín Navarro Vergara; Nicholas Malcolm	6^{5} 7^{7}	1; 6
3	(Bolivia) (Jamaica)	Carlos Martín Navarro Vergara / Pablo Ugarte; Nicholas Malcolm / Scott Willinsky	2; 6	6; 3	5; 7

=== El Salvador vs. Bermuda ===
El Salvador
3
Maya Country Club, San Salvador, El Salvador
7 March 1996

Bermuda
0

			1	2	3
1	(El Salvador) (Bermuda)	Manuel Antonio Tejada Ruiz; Michael Way	6; 0	6; 3
2	(El Salvador) (Bermuda)	Miguel Merz; Richard Mallory	6; 3	6; 2
3	(El Salvador) (Bermuda)	Miguel Merz / Manuel Antonio Tejada Ruiz; Stephen Bean / James Collieson	6; 3	6; 0

=== Bolivia vs. Panama ===
Bolivia
1
Maya Country Club, San Salvador, El Salvador
7 March 1996

Panama
2

			1	2	3
1	(Bolivia) (Panama)	Pablo Ugarte; Juan Pablo Herrera	2; 6	6^{5} 7^{7}
2	(Bolivia) (Panama)	Carlos Martín Navarro Vergara; Carlos Silva	7^{7} 6^{3}	2; 6	6; 4
3	(Bolivia) (Panama)	Carlos Martín Navarro Vergara / Pablo Ugarte; Gustavo Garibaldi / Jan Gelabert	4; 6	5; 7

=== Eastern Caribbean vs. Jamaica ===
Eastern Caribbean
1
Maya Country Club, San Salvador, El Salvador
7 March 1996

Jamaica
2

			1	2	3
1	(Eastern Caribbean) (Jamaica)	Kane Easter; Nakia Gordon	7^{14} 6^{12}	6; 4
2	(Eastern Caribbean) (Jamaica)	Henri Sinson; Nicholas Malcolm	5; 7	3; 6
3	(Eastern Caribbean) (Jamaica)	Kane Easter / Henri Sinson; Nicholas Malcolm / Scott Willinsky	2; 6	3; 6

=== El Salvador vs. Panama ===
El Salvador
3
Maya Country Club, San Salvador, El Salvador
8 March 1996

Panama
0

			1	2	3
1	(El Salvador) (Panama)	Manuel Antonio Tejada Ruiz; Jan Gelabert	6; 3	6; 1
2	(El Salvador) (Panama)	Miguel Merz; Juan Pablo Herrera	6; 4	6; 4
3	(El Salvador) (Panama)	Miguel Merz / Manuel Antonio Tejada Ruiz; Gustavo Garibaldi / Jan Gelabert	6; 1	7; 5

=== Bermuda vs. Jamaica ===
Bermuda
0
Maya Country Club, San Salvador, El Salvador
8 March 1996

Jamaica
3

			1	2	3
1	(Bermuda) (Jamaica)	Michael Way; Scott Willinsky	5; 7	7^{7} 6^{2}	5; 7
2	(Bermuda) (Jamaica)	Richard Mallory; Nicholas Malcolm	1; 6	1; 6
3	(Bermuda) (Jamaica)	James Collieson / Richard Mallory; Nakia Gordon / Elvis Henry	7; 5	3; 6	3; 6

=== Bolivia vs. Eastern Caribbean ===
Bolivia
3
Maya Country Club, San Salvador, El Salvador
8 March 1996

Eastern Caribbean
0

			1	2	3
1	(Bolivia) (Eastern Caribbean)	Eduardo Kohlberg Ruíz; Kane Easter	7; 5	6; 2
2	(Bolivia) (Eastern Caribbean)	Carlos Martín Navarro Vergara; Henri Sinson	6; 2	6; 3
3	(Bolivia) (Eastern Caribbean)	Eduardo Kohlberg Ruíz / Hernán Marcelo Quiroga Rojas; Kane Easter / Richard Hughes	6; 4	6; 1

=== El Salvador vs. Jamaica ===
El Salvador
2
Maya Country Club, San Salvador, El Salvador
9 March 1996

Jamaica
1

			1	2	3
1	(El Salvador) (Jamaica)	Manuel Antonio Tejada Ruiz; Scott Willinsky	7^{7} 6^{5}	6; 4
2	(El Salvador) (Jamaica)	Miguel Merz; Nicholas Malcolm	6; 1	6; 4
3	(El Salvador) (Jamaica)	José Baires / Rafael Fuentes; Nicholas Malcolm / Scott Willinsky	4; 6	3; 6

=== Bermuda vs. Bolivia ===
Bermuda
0
Maya Country Club, San Salvador, El Salvador
9 March 1996

Bolivia
3

			1	2	3
1	(Bermuda) (Bolivia)	James Collieson; Pablo Ugarte	4; 6	2; 6
2	(Bermuda) (Bolivia)	Michael Way; Carlos Martín Navarro Vergara	3; 6	4; 6
3	(Bermuda) (Bolivia)	Stephen Bean / Richard Mallory; Eduardo Kohlberg Ruíz / Hernán Marcelo Quiroga Rojas	2; 6	4; 6

=== Eastern Caribbean vs. Panama ===
Eastern Caribbean
1
Maya Country Club, San Salvador, El Salvador
9 March 1996

Panama
2

			1	2	3
1	(Eastern Caribbean) (Panama)	Kane Easter; Juan Pablo Herrera	6; 3	4; 6	1; 6
2	(Eastern Caribbean) (Panama)	Henri Sinson; Carlos Silva	6^{4} 7^{7}	4; 6
3	(Eastern Caribbean) (Panama)	Kirt Cable / Richard Hughes; Gustavo Garibaldi / Juan Pablo Herrera	5; 7	7; 5	11; 9

=== El Salvador vs. Bolivia ===
El Salvador
3
Maya Country Club, San Salvador, El Salvador
10 March 1996

Bolivia
0

			1	2	3
1	(El Salvador) (Bolivia)	Manuel Antonio Tejada Ruiz; Eduardo Kohlberg Ruíz	6; 3	6; 2
2	(El Salvador) (Bolivia)	Miguel Merz; Carlos Martín Navarro Vergara	6; 3	4; 6	8; 6
3	(El Salvador) (Bolivia)	Rafael Fuentes / Miguel Merz; Carlos Martín Navarro Vergara / Pablo Ugarte	6; 4	6; 2

=== Bermuda vs. Eastern Caribbean ===
Bermuda
2
Maya Country Club, San Salvador, El Salvador
10 March 1996

Eastern Caribbean
1

			1	2	3
1	(Bermuda) (Eastern Caribbean)	James Collieson; Kane Easter	1; 6	3; 6
2	(Bermuda) (Eastern Caribbean)	Michael Way; Henri Sinson	6; 3	6^{2} 7^{7}	8; 6
3	(Bermuda) (Eastern Caribbean)	Richard Mallory / Michael Way; Kirt Cable / Richard Hughes	5; 7	6; 0	6; 4

=== Jamaica vs. Panama ===
Jamaica
0
Maya Country Club, San Salvador, El Salvador
10 March 1996

Panama
3

			1	2	3
1	(Jamaica) (Panama)	Scott Willinsky; Juan Pablo Herrera	5; 7	6^{5} 7^{7}
2	(Jamaica) (Panama)	Nicholas Malcolm; Carlos Silva	3; 6	6; 0	0; 6
3	(Jamaica) (Panama)	Nakia Gordon / Elvis Henry; Gustavo Garibaldi / Juan Pablo Herrera	5; 7	4; 6
