= 2002 Davis Cup Americas Zone Group III =

International tennis competition

The Group III tournament was held April 3–7, in San Salvador, El Salvador, on outdoor clay courts.

== Format ==
The eight teams were split into two groups and played in a round-robin format. The top two teams of each group advanced to the promotion pool, from which the two top teams were promoted to the Americas Zone Group II in 2003. The bottom two teams of each group were placed in the relegation pool, from which the two bottom teams were demoted to the Americas Zone Group IV in 2003.

== Pool A ==
Team	Pld	W	L	MF	MA
Dominican Republic	3	2	1	6	3
El Salvador	3	2	1	6	3
Puerto Rico	3	2	1	5	4
Panama	3	0	3	1	8

=== El Salvador vs. Puerto Rico ===
El Salvador
2
San Salvador, El Salvador
3 April 2002

Puerto Rico
1

			1	2	3
1	(El Salvador) (Puerto Rico)	José Baires; Luis Haddock	6; 2	6; 3
2	(El Salvador) (Puerto Rico)	Manuel-Antonio Tejada-Ruiz; Gabriel Montilla	6^{2} 7^{7}	4; 6
3	(El Salvador) (Puerto Rico)	José Baires / Augusto Sanabria; Ricardo Jordan / Gabriel Montilla	6; 3	4; 6	7; 5

=== Panama vs. Dominican Republic ===
Panama
0
San Salvador, El Salvador
3 April 2002

Dominican Republic
3

			1	2	3
1	(Panama) (Dominican Republic)	Arnulfo Courtney; Juan Berrido-Fernández	3; 6	1; 6
2	(Panama) (Dominican Republic)	Chadd Valdes; Víctor Estrella Burgos	2; 6	3; 6
3	(Panama) (Dominican Republic)	Braen Aneiros Romero / John Silva; Jose Bernard / Víctor Estrella Burgos	3; 6	2; 6

=== El Salvador vs. Dominican Republic ===
El Salvador
1
San Salvador, El Salvador
4 April 2002

Dominican Republic
2

			1	2	3
1	(El Salvador) (Dominican Republic)	José Baires; Juan Berrido-Fernández	6; 2	1; 6	6; 3
2	(El Salvador) (Dominican Republic)	Manuel-Antonio Tejada-Ruiz; Víctor Estrella Burgos	4; 6	1; 6
3	(El Salvador) (Dominican Republic)	José Baires / Augusto Sanabria; Jose Bernard / Víctor Estrella Burgos	6^{5} 7^{7}	4; 6

=== Panama vs. Puerto Rico ===
Panama
1
San Salvador, El Salvador
4 April 2002

Puerto Rico
2

			1	2	3
1	(Panama) (Puerto Rico)	Arnulfo Courtney; Nicolas Lopez	6; 2	6; 4
2	(Panama) (Puerto Rico)	Chadd Valdes; Gabriel Montilla	5; 7	2; 6
3	(Panama) (Puerto Rico)	Braen Aneiros Romero / Chadd Valdes; Ricardo Jordan / Gabriel Montilla	3; 6	4; 6

=== El Salvador vs. Panama ===
El Salvador
3
San Salvador, El Salvador
5 April 2002

Panama
0

			1	2	3
1	(El Salvador) (Panama)	José Baires; Braen Aneiros Romero	6; 2	6; 1
2	(El Salvador) (Panama)	Manuel-Antonio Tejada-Ruiz; Chadd Valdes	6; 2	1; 0		retired
3	(El Salvador) (Panama)	Augusto Sanabria / Manuel-Antonio Tejada-Ruiz; Braen Aneiros Romero / John Silva	6; 4	6; 4

=== Puerto Rico vs. Dominican Republic ===
Puerto Rico
2
San Salvador, El Salvador
5 April 2002

Dominican Republic
1

			1	2	3
1	(Puerto Rico) (Dominican Republic)	Luis Haddock; Juan Berrido-Fernández	4; 6	2; 6
2	(Puerto Rico) (Dominican Republic)	Gabriel Montilla; Víctor Estrella Burgos	6; 2	6; 1
3	(Puerto Rico) (Dominican Republic)	Ricardo Jordan / Gabriel Montilla; Jose Bernard / Víctor Estrella Burgos	6; 4	7^{7} 6^{1}

== Pool B ==
Team	Pld	W	L	MF	MA
Haiti	3	3	0	7	2
Jamaica	3	2	1	7	2
Honduras	3	1	2	4	5
Costa Rica	3	0	3	0	9

=== Costa Rica vs. Jamaica ===
Costa Rica
0
San Salvador, El Salvador
3 April 2002

Jamaica
3

			1	2	3
1	(Costa Rica) (Jamaica)	Juan Carlos González; Ryan Russell	3; 6	0; 6
2	(Costa Rica) (Jamaica)	Federico Camacho; Scott Willinsky	4; 6	2; 6
3	(Costa Rica) (Jamaica)	David Alvarado / Diego Alvarado; Damar Johnson / Jermaine Smith	6^{4} 7^{7}	2; 6

=== Honduras vs. Haiti ===
Honduras
1
San Salvador, El Salvador
3 April 2002

Haiti
2

			1	2	3
1	(Honduras) (Haiti)	Calton Álvarez; Bertrand Madsen	1; 6	3; 6
2	(Honduras) (Haiti)	Carlos Cáceres; Iphton Louis	6; 2	7; 5
3	(Honduras) (Haiti)	Carlos Cáceres / Pablo Hernández; Iphton Louis / Bertrand Madsen	6^{6} 7^{8}	1; 6

=== Costa Rica vs. Haiti ===
Costa Rica
0
San Salvador, El Salvador
4 April 2002

Haiti
3

			1	2	3
1	(Costa Rica) (Haiti)	David Alvarado; Bertrand Madsen	1; 6	2; 6
2	(Costa Rica) (Haiti)	Federico Camacho; Iphton Louis	1; 6	6^{5} 7^{7}
3	(Costa Rica) (Haiti)	Diego Alvarado / Federico Camacho; Joel Allen / Carl-Henry Barthold	3; 6	6; 2	3; 6

=== Honduras vs. Jamaica ===
Honduras
0
San Salvador, El Salvador
4 April 2002

Jamaica
3

			1	2	3
1	(Honduras) (Jamaica)	Calton Álvarez; Ryan Russell	1; 6	0; 6
2	(Honduras) (Jamaica)	Carlos Cáceres; Scott Willinsky	4; 6	4; 6
3	(Honduras) (Jamaica)	Francklin García / Pablo Hernández; Damar Johnson / Jermaine Smith	3; 6	6^{7} 7^{9}

=== Costa Rica vs. Honduras ===
Costa Rica
0
San Salvador, El Salvador
5 April 2002

Honduras
3

			1	2	3
1	(Costa Rica) (Honduras)	Juan Carlos González; Calton Álvarez	2; 6	3; 6
2	(Costa Rica) (Honduras)	Federico Camacho; Carlos Cáceres	3; 6	4; 6
3	(Costa Rica) (Honduras)	Diego Alvarado / Federico Camacho; Francklin García / Pablo Hernández	4; 6	7; 5	3; 6

=== Jamaica vs. Haiti ===
Jamaica
1
San Salvador, El Salvador
5 April 2002

Haiti
2

			1	2	3
1	(Jamaica) (Haiti)	Ryan Russell; Bertrand Madsen	2; 6	5; 7
2	(Jamaica) (Haiti)	Scott Willinsky; Iphton Louis	4; 6	6^{4} 7^{7}
3	(Jamaica) (Haiti)	Damar Johnson / Jermaine Smith; Joel Allen / Carl-Henry Barthold	6; 3	7; 5

== Promotion pool ==
The top two teams from each of Pools A and B advanced to the Promotion pool. Results and points from games against the opponent from the preliminary round were carried forward.

Team	Pld	W	L	MF	MA
Dominican Republic	3	3	0	7	2
Haiti	3	2	1	4	5
Jamaica	3	1	2	4	5
El Salvador	3	0	3	3	6

Dominican Republic and Haiti promoted to Group II for 2003.

=== Dominican Republic vs. Jamaica ===
Dominican Republic
2
San Salvador, El Salvador
6 April 2002

Jamaica
1

			1	2	3
1	(Dominican Republic) (Jamaica)	Juan Berrido-Fernández; Ryan Russell	4; 6	3; 6
2	(Dominican Republic) (Jamaica)	Víctor Estrella Burgos; Scott Willinsky	7^{7} 6^{3}	6; 1
3	(Dominican Republic) (Jamaica)	Jose Bernard / Víctor Estrella Burgos; Damar Johnson / Jermaine Smith	7^{7} 6^{5}	6; 4

=== Haiti vs. El Salvador ===
Haiti
2
San Salvador, El Salvador
6 April 2002

El Salvador
1

			1	2	3
1	(Haiti) (El Salvador)	Bertrand Madsen; José Baires	6; 2	6; 3
2	(Haiti) (El Salvador)	Iphton Louis; Manuel-Antonio Tejada-Ruiz	7; 5	2; 6	1; 6
3	(Haiti) (El Salvador)	Joel Allen / Bertrand Madsen; José Baires / Augusto Sanabria	6; 3	3; 6	14; 12

=== Dominican Republic vs. Haiti ===
Dominican Republic
3
San Salvador, El Salvador
7 April 2002

Haiti
0

			1	2	3
1	(Dominican Republic) (Haiti)	Jose Bernard; Carl-Henry Barthold	6; 3	6; 4
2	(Dominican Republic) (Haiti)	Víctor Estrella Burgos; Iphton Louis	6; 2	7^{7} 6^{1}
3	(Dominican Republic) (Haiti)	Jose Bernard / Jose-Antonio Velazquez; Joel Allen / Carl-Henry Barthold	6; 4	6^{7} 7^{9}	6; 4

=== El Salvador vs. Jamaica ===
El Salvador
1
San Salvador, El Salvador
7 April 2002

Jamaica
2

			1	2	3
1	(El Salvador) (Jamaica)	Augusto Sanabria; Damar Johnson	3; 6	6; 3	6; 4
2	(El Salvador) (Jamaica)	Manuel-Antonio Tejada-Ruiz; Scott Willinsky	6^{4} 7^{7}	4; 6
3	(El Salvador) (Jamaica)	Jaime Cuellar / Augusto Sanabria; Damar Johnson / Scott Willinsky	2; 6	4; 6

== Relegation pool ==
The bottom two teams from Pools A and B were placed in the relegation group. Results and points from games against the opponent from the preliminary round were carried forward.

Team	Pld	W	L	MF	MA
Honduras	3	3	0	9	0
Puerto Rico	3	2	1	5	4
Costa Rica	3	1	2	2	7
Panama	3	0	3	2	7

Costa Rica and Panama demoted to Group IV for 2003.

=== Puerto Rico vs. Costa Rica ===
Puerto Rico
3
San Salvador, El Salvador
6 April 2002

Costa Rica
0

			1	2	3
1	(Puerto Rico) (Costa Rica)	Luis Haddock; David Alvarado	7^{7} 6^{2}	6; 3
2	(Puerto Rico) (Costa Rica)	Gabriel Montilla; Federico Camacho	6; 0	7^{9} 6^{7}
3	(Puerto Rico) (Costa Rica)	Ricardo Jordan / Gabriel Montilla; David Alvarado / Diego Alvarado	6; 3	6; 2

=== Honduras vs. Panama ===
Honduras
3
San Salvador, El Salvador
6 April 2002

Panama
0

			1	2	3
1	(Honduras) (Panama)	Calton Álvarez; Arnulfo Courtney	7^{7} 6^{1}	6; 4
2	(Honduras) (Panama)	Carlos Cáceres; Chadd Valdes	6; 3	7; 5
3	(Honduras) (Panama)	Francklin García / Pablo Hernández; Braen Aneiros Romero / Chadd Valdes	6; 3	6; 3

=== Puerto Rico vs. Honduras ===
Puerto Rico
0
San Salvador, El Salvador
7 April 2002

Honduras
3

			1	2	3
1	(Puerto Rico) (Honduras)	Ricardo Jordan; Calton Álvarez	3; 6	7^{7} 6^{3}	0; 6
2	(Puerto Rico) (Honduras)	Nicolas Lopez; Carlos Cáceres	2; 6	1; 6
3	(Puerto Rico) (Honduras)	Ricardo Jordan / Nicolas Lopez; Francklin García / Pablo Hernández	4; 6	5; 7

=== Panama vs. Costa Rica ===
Panama
1
San Salvador, El Salvador
7 April 2002

Costa Rica
2

			1	2	3
1	(Panama) (Costa Rica)	John Silva; David Alvarado	5; 7	6; 2	4; 6
2	(Panama) (Costa Rica)	Braen Aneiros Romero; Juan Carlos González	7; 5	1; 6	6; 8
3	(Panama) (Costa Rica)	Braen Aneiros Romero / John Silva; Diego Alvarado / Juan Carlos González				w/o

== Final standings ==
Rank	Team
1	Dominican Republic
2	Haiti
3	Jamaica
4	El Salvador
5	Honduras
6	Puerto Rico
7	Costa Rica
8	Panama

- Dominican Republic and Haiti promoted to Group II in 2003.
- Costa Rica and Panama relegated to Group IV in 2003.
