= 2007 Davis Cup Americas Zone Group III =

International tennis competition

The Group III tournament was held on June 20–24, in Federación Nacional de Tenis de Guatemala, Guatemala City, Guatemala on outdoor hard courts.

== Format ==
The eight teams were split into two groups and played in a round-robin format. The top two teams of each group advanced to the promotion pool, from which the two top teams were promoted to the Americas Zone Group II in 2008. The last two placed teams of each group from the preliminary round were relegated into the relegation pool, from which the two bottom teams were relegated to the Americas Zone Group IV in 2008.

== Pool A ==
	Pool A	BAH	GUA	BAR	HAI
1	Bahamas (3–0)		3–0	2–1	3–0
2	Guatemala (2–1)	0–3		3–0	3–0
3	Barbados (1–2)	1–2	0–3		3–0
4	Haiti (0–3)	0–3	0–3	0–3	

=== Bahamas vs. Haiti ===
Bahamas
3
Federación Nacional de Tenis de Guatemala, Guatemala City, Guatemala
20 June 2007
Hard

Haiti
0

			1	2	3
1	(The Bahamas) (Haiti)	Marvin Rolle; Jean Marc Bazanne	6; 1	6; 3
2	(The Bahamas) (Haiti)	Devin Mullings; Gael Gaetjens	6; 4	6; 1
3	(The Bahamas) (Haiti)	Bjorn Munroe / Marvin Rolle; Joel Allen / Jean Marc Bazanne	6; 4	6; 3

=== Guatemala vs. Barbados ===
Guatemala
3
Federación Nacional de Tenis de Guatemala, Guatemala City, Guatemala
20 June 2007
Hard

Barbados
0

			1	2	3
1	(Guatemala) (Barbados)	Christian Saravia; Michael Date	3; 6	6; 3	7; 5
2	(Guatemala) (Barbados)	Cristian Paiz; Haydn Lewis	5; 7	6; 1	6; 3
3	(Guatemala) (Barbados)	Manuel Chávez / Sebastien Vidal; Akil Burgess / Russell Moseley	6; 4	7^{7} 6^{4}

=== Bahamas vs. Guatemala ===
Bahamas
3
Federación Nacional de Tenis de Guatemala, Guatemala City, Guatemala
21 June 2007
Hard

Guatemala
0

			1	2	3
1	(The Bahamas) (Guatemala)	Marvin Rolle; Christian Saravia	6; 3	6; 1
2	(The Bahamas) (Guatemala)	Devin Mullings; Cristian Paiz	6; 1	6; 2
3	(The Bahamas) (Guatemala)	Devin Mullings / Marvin Rolle; Manuel Chávez / Sebastien Vidal	6; 2	7^{7} 6^{3}

=== Haiti vs. Barbados ===
Haiti
0
Federación Nacional de Tenis de Guatemala, Guatemala City, Guatemala
21 June 2007
Hard

Barbados
3

			1	2	3
1	(Haiti) (Barbados)	Jean Marc Bazanne; Michael Date	3; 6	6^{4} 7^{7}
2	(Haiti) (Barbados)	Gael Gaetjens; Haydn Lewis	1; 6	2; 6
3	(Haiti) (Barbados)	Joel Allen / Gael Gaetjens; Haydn Lewis / Russell Moseley	6^{4} 7^{7}	4; 6

=== Bahamas vs. Barbados ===
Bahamas
2
Federación Nacional de Tenis de Guatemala, Guatemala City, Guatemala
22 June 2007
Hard

Barbados
1

			1	2	3
1	(The Bahamas) (Barbados)	Marvin Rolle; Michael Date	6; 0	6; 2
2	(The Bahamas) (Barbados)	Devin Mullings; Haydn Lewis	3; 6	6^{5} 7^{7}
3	(The Bahamas) (Barbados)	Bjorn Munroe / Marvin Rolle; Haydn Lewis / Russell Moseley	7^{7} 6^{5}	4; 6	8; 6

=== Haiti vs. Guatemala ===
Haiti
0
Federación Nacional de Tenis de Guatemala, Guatemala City, Guatemala
22 June 2007
Hard

Guatemala
3

			1	2	3
1	(Haiti) (Guatemala)	Joel Allen; Manuel Chávez	2; 6	6; 4	10; 12
2	(Haiti) (Guatemala)	Gael Gaetjens; Cristian Paiz	1; 6	1; 2		retired
3	(Haiti) (Guatemala)	Jérome Barthes / Jean Marc Bazanne; Cristian Paiz / Sebastien Vidal	1; 6	4; 6

== Pool B ==
	Pool B	BOL	PUR	PAN	CRC
1	Bolivia (3–0)		3–0	3–0	3–0
2	Puerto Rico (2–1)	0–3		3–0	2–1
3	Panama (1–2)	0–3	0–3		2–1
4	Costa Rica (0–3)	0–3	1–2	1–2	

=== Costa Rica vs. Bolivia ===
Costa Rica
0
Federación Nacional de Tenis de Guatemala, Guatemala City, Guatemala
20 June 2007
Hard

Bolivia
3

			1	2	3
1	(Costa Rica) (Bolivia)	Geoffrey Barton; Mauricio Doria-Medina	5; 7	3; 6
2	(Costa Rica) (Bolivia)	Ignaci Roca; Mauricio Estívariz	5; 7	2; 6
3	(Costa Rica) (Bolivia)	Rafael Ávalos Brenes / Ignaci Roca; Diego Camacho / Mauricio Estívariz	5; 7	7^{7} 6^{3}	4; 6

=== Puerto Rico vs. Panama ===
Puerto Rico
3
Federación Nacional de Tenis de Guatemala, Guatemala City, Guatemala
20 June 2007
Hard

Panama
0

			1	2	3
1	(Puerto Rico) (Panama)	Alex Llompart; Arnulfo Courtney	6; 1	2; 0		retired
2	(Puerto Rico) (Panama)	Gilberto Álvarez; Alberto González	6; 3	4; 6	6; 2
3	(Puerto Rico) (Panama)	Eduardo Pavia Suárez / Jose Emilio Sierra-Short; Augusto Alvarado / Juan Miguel González	5; 7	7; 5	6; 1

=== Costa Rica vs. Panama ===
Costa Rica
1
Federación Nacional de Tenis de Guatemala, Guatemala City, Guatemala
21 June 2007
Hard

Panama
2

			1	2	3
1	(Costa Rica) (Panama)	Geoffrey Barton; Juan Miguel González	7^{7} 6^{4}	6; 0
2	(Costa Rica) (Panama)	Ignaci Roca; Alberto González	1; 6	0; 6
3	(Costa Rica) (Panama)	Rafael Ávalos Brenes / Ignaci Roca; Augusto Alvarado / Alberto González	7^{9} 6^{7}	2; 6	4; 6

=== Bolivia vs. Puerto Rico ===
Bolivia
3
Federación Nacional de Tenis de Guatemala, Guatemala City, Guatemala
21 June 2007
Hard

Puerto Rico
0

			1	2	3
1	(Bolivia) (Puerto Rico)	Mauricio Doria-Medina; Alex Llompart	6; 2	6; 1
2	(Bolivia) (Puerto Rico)	Mauricio Estívariz; Gilberto Álvarez	6; 4	3; 6	6; 1
3	(Bolivia) (Puerto Rico)	Diego Camacho / Mauricio Doria-Medina; Gilberto Álvarez / Alex Llompart	7^{7} 6^{5}	6; 4

=== Costa Rica vs. Puerto Rico ===
Costa Rica
1
Federación Nacional de Tenis de Guatemala, Guatemala City, Guatemala
22 June 2007
Hard

Puerto Rico
2

			1	2	3
1	(Costa Rica) (Puerto Rico)	José-Eduardo Pinto-Guardia; Eduardo Pavia Suárez	6^{5} 7^{7}	6; 1	7; 5
2	(Costa Rica) (Puerto Rico)	Rafael Ávalos Brenes; Gilberto Álvarez	4; 6	3; 6
3	(Costa Rica) (Puerto Rico)	Geoffrey Barton / Ignaci Roca; Gilberto Álvarez / Alex Llompart	6^{6} 7^{8}	3; 6

=== Bolivia vs. Panama ===
Bolivia
3
Federación Nacional de Tenis de Guatemala, Guatemala City, Guatemala
22 June 2007
Hard

Panama
0

			1	2	3
1	(Bolivia) (Panama)	Diego Camacho; Juan Miguel González	6; 0	6; 0
2	(Bolivia) (Panama)	Mauricio Doria-Medina; Alberto González	6; 4	6; 4
3	(Bolivia) (Panama)	Diego Camacho / Mauricio Estívariz; Augusto Alvarado / Juan Miguel González	6; 1	6; 4

== Promotion pool ==
The top two teams from each of Pools A and B advanced to the Promotion pool. Results and points from games against the opponent from the preliminary round were carried forward.

(scores in italics carried over from Groups)

	1st–4th Play-off	BAH	BOL	PUR	GUA
1	Bahamas (3–0)		2–1	2–1	3–0
2	Bolivia (2–1)	1–2		3–0	2–0
3	Puerto Rico (1–2)	1–2	0–3		2–1
4	Guatemala (0–3)	0–3	0–2	1–2	

- Bahamas and Bolivia promoted to Group II in 2008.

=== Bahamas vs. Bolivia ===
Bahamas
2
Federación Nacional de Tenis de Guatemala, Guatemala City, Guatemala
23 June 2007
Hard

Bolivia
1

			1	2	3
1	(The Bahamas) (Bolivia)	Marvin Rolle; Mauricio Doria-Medina	7^{7} 6^{1}	6; 2
2	(The Bahamas) (Bolivia)	Devin Mullings; Mauricio Estívariz	6; 2	6; 2
3	(The Bahamas) (Bolivia)	Bjorn Munroe / H'Cone Thompson; Mauricio Doria-Medina / Mauricio Estívariz	7^{7} 6^{5}	1; 6	5; 7

=== Puerto Rico vs. Guatemala ===
Puerto Rico
2
Federación Nacional de Tenis de Guatemala, Guatemala City, Guatemala
23 June 2007
Hard

Guatemala
1

			1	2	3
1	(Puerto Rico) (Guatemala)	Alex Llompart; Sebastien Vidal	6; 4	7; 5	6; 4
2	(Puerto Rico) (Guatemala)	Gilberto Álvarez; Cristian Paiz	6; 4	6; 3
3	(Puerto Rico) (Guatemala)	Eduardo Pavia Suárez / Jose Emilio Sierra-Short; Manuel Chávez / Cristian Paiz	3; 6	1; 6

=== Bahamas vs. Puerto Rico ===
Bahamas
2
Federación Nacional de Tenis de Guatemala, Guatemala City, Guatemala
24 June 2007
Hard

Puerto Rico
1

			1	2	3
1	(The Bahamas) (Puerto Rico)	Marvin Rolle; Alex Llompart	7^{7} 6^{5}	6; 2
2	(The Bahamas) (Puerto Rico)	Devin Mullings; Gilberto Álvarez	6; 2	7; 5
3	(The Bahamas) (Puerto Rico)	Bjorn Munroe / H'Cone Thompson; Gilberto Álvarez / Alex Llompart	6; 4	6^{4} 7^{7}	4; 6

=== Guatemala vs. Bolivia ===
Guatemala
0
Federación Nacional de Tenis de Guatemala, Guatemala City, Guatemala
24 June 2007
Hard

Bolivia
2

			1	2	3
1	(Guatemala) (Bolivia)	Christian Saravia; Diego Camacho	7^{7} 6^{5}	2; 6	3; 6
2	(Guatemala) (Bolivia)	Cristian Paiz; Mauricio Doria-Medina	4; 6	6^{4} 7^{7}
3	(Guatemala) (Bolivia)	Cristian Paiz / Christian Saravia; Diego Camacho / Mauricio Doria-Medina				not played

== Relegation pool ==
The bottom two teams from Pools A and B were placed in the relegation group. Results and points from games against the opponent from the preliminary round were carried forward.

(scores in italics carried over from Groups)

	5th–8th Play-off	BAR	PAN	HAI	CRC
1	Barbados (2–1)		3–0	3–0	0–3
2	Panama (2–1)	0–3		2–0	2–1
3	Haiti (1–2)	0–3	0–2		2–1
4	Costa Rica (1–2)	3–0	1–2	1–2	

- Haiti and Costa Rica relegated to Group IV in 2008.

=== Barbados vs. Panama ===
Barbados
3
Federación Nacional de Tenis de Guatemala, Guatemala City, Guatemala
23 June 2007
Hard

Panama
0

			1	2	3
1	(Barbados) (Panama)	Russell Moseley; Augusto Alvarado	6; 4	6; 4
2	(Barbados) (Panama)	Haydn Lewis; Alberto González	6; 4	6; 3
3	(Barbados) (Panama)	Akil Burgess / Russell Moseley; Augusto Alvarado / Juan Miguel González	3; 2			retired

=== Haiti vs. Costa Rica ===
Haiti
2
Federación Nacional de Tenis de Guatemala, Guatemala City, Guatemala
23 June 2007
Hard

Costa Rica
1

			1	2	3
1	(Haiti) (Costa Rica)	Jean Marc Bazanne; Geoffrey Barton	6; 1	6; 3
2	(Haiti) (Costa Rica)	Gael Gaetjens; Ignaci Roca	6; 3	2; 6	6; 1
3	(Haiti) (Costa Rica)	Jérome Barthes / Jean Marc Bazanne; Rafael Ávalos Brenes / José-Eduardo Pinto-Guardia	6^{5} 7^{7}	4; 6

=== Barbados vs. Costa Rica ===
Barbados
0
Federación Nacional de Tenis de Guatemala, Guatemala City, Guatemala
24 June 2007
Hard

Costa Rica
3

			1	2	3
1	(Barbados) (Costa Rica)	Akil Burgess; José-Eduardo Pinto-Guardia	6^{3} 7^{7}	5; 4		retired
2	(Barbados) (Costa Rica)	Russell Moseley; Geoffrey Barton				w/o
3	(Barbados) (Costa Rica)	Akil Burgess / Michael Date; Rafael Ávalos Brenes / Ignaci Roca				w/o

=== Panama vs. Haiti ===
Panama
2
Federación Nacional de Tenis de Guatemala, Guatemala City, Guatemala
24 June 2007
Hard

Haiti
0

			1	2	3
1	(Panama) (Haiti)	Juan Miguel González; Joel Allen	7^{7} 6^{2}	1; 2	11; 9
2	(Panama) (Haiti)	Alberto González; Gael Gaetjens	6; 4	7^{7} 6^{5}
3	(Panama) (Haiti)	Alberto González / Juan Miguel González; Joel Allen / Gael Gaetjens				not played

== Final standings ==
Rank	Team
1	Bahamas
2	Bolivia
3	Puerto Rico
4	Guatemala
5	Barbados
6	Panama
7	Haiti
8	Costa Rica

- Bahamas and Bolivia promoted to Group II in 2008.
- Haiti and Costa Rica relegated to Group IV in 2008.
