= 2014 Davis Cup Americas Zone Group III =

International tennis competition

The Americas Zone was one of the four zones within Group 3 of the regional Davis Cup competition in 2014. The zone's competition was held in round robin format in Humacao, Puerto Rico, in June 2014. The nine competing nations were divided into one pool of four and one of five. The winners and runners up from each pool played off to determine the two nations to be promoted to Americas Zone Group II in 2015, while the third and fourth placed nations played to off to determine overall placings within the group.

== Draw ==
The nine teams were divided into one pool of four and one of five. The winner of each pool plays off against the runner-up of the other pool, and the two winners of these play-offs are promoted to Americas Zone Group II in 2015. The third and fourth placed teams in each pool play off against the equivalent team from the other pool to determine overall rankings within the group. The fifth placed team in Pool B does not enter the play-offs.

The group was staged from 2 to 7 June 2014 at the Palmas Athletic Club in Humacao, Puerto Rico.

Pool A

	Cuba	Bahamas	Honduras	Panama	RR W–L	Matches W–L	Sets W–L	Games W–L	Standings
Cuba		2–1	3–0	3–0	3–0	8–1	16–4	105–70	1
Bahamas	1–2		3–0	2–1	2–1	6–3	15–6	111–70	2
Honduras	0–3	0–3		3–0	2–1	3–6	6–13	72–102	3
Panama	0–3	1–2	0–3		0–3	1–8	3–17	72–118	4

Pool B

	Puerto Rico	Costa Rica	Bermuda	Jamaica	Trinidad and Tobago	RR W–L	Matches W–L	Sets W–L	Games W–L	Standings
Puerto Rico		2–1	3–0	3–0	3–0	4–0	11–1	23–3	151–78	1
Costa Rica	1–2		3–0	3–0	3–0	3–1	10–2	21–7	150–112	2
Bermuda	0–3	0–3		2–1	3–0	2–2	5–7	13–15	125–117	3
Jamaica	0–3	0–3	1–2		2–1	1–3	3–9	7–19	99–143	4
Trinidad and Tobago	0–3	0–3	0–3	1–2		0–4	1–11	3–23	75–142	5

== First round ==
=== Pool A ===
==== Bahamas vs. Cuba ====
Bahamas
1
Palmas Athletic Club, Humacao, Puerto Rico
2 June 2014
Hard - Asphalt (bitumen-bound aggregate), Outdoor

Cuba
2

			1	2	3
1	(The Bahamas) (Cuba)	Devin Mullings; Randy Blanco	6; 2	6; 0
2	(The Bahamas) (Cuba)	Kevin Major; William Dorantes Sanchez	3; 6	6; 1	5; 7
3	(The Bahamas) (Cuba)	Jamaal Adderley / Marvin Rolle; Ernesto Alfonso / Randy Blanco	6; 3	1; 6	3; 6

==== Honduras vs. Panama ====
Honduras
3
Palmas Athletic Club, Humacao, Puerto Rico
2 June 2014
Hard - Asphalt (bitumen-bound aggregate), Outdoor

Panama
0

			1	2	3
1	(Honduras) (Panama)	Ricardo Pineda; Giuseppe Guarnieri	7; 5	6; 1
2	(Honduras) (Panama)	Keny Turcios; Walner Espinoza	6; 2	7^{7} 6^{5}
3	(Honduras) (Panama)	Alejandro Obando / Keny Turcios; José Gilbert Gómez / Luis Gómez	4; 6	7; 5	6; 3

==== Bahamas vs. Panama ====
Bahamas
2
Palmas Athletic Club, Humacao, Puerto Rico
4 June 2014
Hard - Asphalt (bitumen-bound aggregate), Outdoor

Panama
1

			1	2	3
1	(The Bahamas) (Panama)	Jamaal Adderley; José Gilbert Gómez	6; 3	6; 1
2	(The Bahamas) (Panama)	Devin Mullings; Walner Espinoza	7; 5	3; 6	3; 6
3	(The Bahamas) (Panama)	Jamaal Adderley / Marvin Rolle; Walner Espinoza / Luis Gómez	6; 4	6; 0

==== Honduras vs. Cuba ====
Honduras
0
Palmas Athletic Club, Humacao, Puerto Rico
4 June 2014
Hard - Asphalt (bitumen-bound aggregate), Outdoor

Cuba
3

			1	2	3
1	(Honduras) (Cuba)	Alejandro Obando; Randy Blanco	3; 6	2; 6
2	(Honduras) (Cuba)	Keny Turcios; William Dorantes Sanchez	3; 6	4; 6
3	(Honduras) (Cuba)	Alejandro Obando / Ricardo Pineda; Ernesto Alfonso / Randy Blanco	2; 6	1; 6

==== Bahamas vs. Honduras ====
Bahamas
3
Palmas Athletic Club, Humacao, Puerto Rico
6 June 2014
Hard - Asphalt (bitumen-bound aggregate), Outdoor

Honduras
0

			1	2	3
1	(The Bahamas) (Honduras)	Jamaal Adderley; Ricardo Pineda	6; 1	7^{7} 6^{4}
2	(The Bahamas) (Honduras)	Devin Mullings; Keny Turcios	7; 5	6; 0
3	(The Bahamas) (Honduras)	Kevin Major / Marvin Rolle; Alejandro Obando / Keny Turcios	6; 1	6; 2

==== Panama vs. Cuba ====
Panama
0
Palmas Athletic Club, Humacao, Puerto Rico
6 June 2014
Hard - Asphalt (bitumen-bound aggregate), Outdoor

Cuba
3

			1	2	3
1	(Panama) (Cuba)	José Gilbert Gómez; Randy Blanco	3; 6	1; 6
2	(Panama) (Cuba)	Luis Gómez; Omar Hernández Moreno	6^{3} 7^{7}	2; 6
3	(Panama) (Cuba)	José Gilbert Gómez / Giuseppe Guarnieri; Ernesto Alfonso / Omar Hernández Moreno	5; 7	2; 6

=== Pool B ===
==== Puerto Rico vs. Bermuda ====
Puerto Rico
3
Palmas Athletic Club, Humacao, Puerto Rico
2 June 2014
Hard - Asphalt (bitumen-bound aggregate), Outdoor

Bermuda
0

			1	2	3
1	(Puerto Rico) (Bermuda)	Gabriel Flores Ruiz; Gavin Manders	6; 2	6; 4
2	(Puerto Rico) (Bermuda)	Alex Llompart; David Thomas	6; 4	6; 0
3	(Puerto Rico) (Bermuda)	Christian Garay / Alex Llompart; Jenson Bascome / Neal Towlson	6; 1	6; 3

==== Costa Rica vs. Trinidad and Tobago ====
Costa Rica
3
Palmas Athletic Club, Humacao, Puerto Rico
2 June 2014
Hard - Asphalt (bitumen-bound aggregate), Outdoor

Trinidad and Tobago
0

			1	2	3
1	(Costa Rica) (Trinidad and Tobago)	Ignaci Roca; Akiel Duke	6; 3	6; 4
2	(Costa Rica) (Trinidad and Tobago)	Pablo Nuñéz; Vaughn Wilson	6; 3	6; 3
3	(Costa Rica) (Trinidad and Tobago)	Alvaro Daniel Riveros / Julián Saborío; Akiel Duke / Nabeel Majeed Mohammed	6; 2	6; 3

==== Puerto Rico vs. Jamaica ====
Puerto Rico
3
Palmas Athletic Club, Humacao, Puerto Rico
3 June 2014
Hard - Asphalt (bitumen-bound aggregate), Outdoor

Jamaica
0

			1	2	3
1	(Puerto Rico) (Jamaica)	Gabriel Flores Ruiz; Brandon Burke	6; 3	6; 2
2	(Puerto Rico) (Jamaica)	Alex Llompart; Dominic Pagon	6; 3	6; 2
3	(Puerto Rico) (Jamaica)	Gilberto Alvarez / Alex Llompart; Daniel Harris / Dominic Pagon	6; 2	6; 4

==== Trinidad and Tobago vs. Bermuda ====
Trinidad and Tobago
0
Palmas Athletic Club, Humacao, Puerto Rico
3 June 2014
Hard - Asphalt (bitumen-bound aggregate), Outdoor

Bermuda
3

			1	2	3
1	(Trinidad and Tobago) (Bermuda)	Vaughn Wilson; Gavin Manders	3; 6	7; 5	1; 6
2	(Trinidad and Tobago) (Bermuda)	Javier Jovani Lewis; David Thomas	2; 6	2; 6
3	(Trinidad and Tobago) (Bermuda)	Akiel Duke / Javier Jovani Lewis; Jenson Bascome / Neal Towlson	1; 6	1; 6

==== Costa Rica vs. Bermuda ====
Costa Rica
3
Palmas Athletic Club, Humacao, Puerto Rico
4 June 2014
Hard - Asphalt (bitumen-bound aggregate), Outdoor

Bermuda
0

			1	2	3
1	(Costa Rica) (Bermuda)	Ignaci Roca; Gavin Manders	6; 3	6; 1
2	(Costa Rica) (Bermuda)	Pablo Nuñéz; David Thomas	2; 6	6; 3	6; 3
3	(Costa Rica) (Bermuda)	Alvaro Daniel Riveros / Julián Saborío; Jenson Bascome / Neal Towlson	0; 6	7^{7} 6^{2}	6; 2

==== Jamaica vs. Trinidad and Tobago ====
Jamaica
2
Palmas Athletic Club, Humacao, Puerto Rico
4 June 2014
Hard - Asphalt (bitumen-bound aggregate), Outdoor

Trinidad and Tobago
1

			1	2	3
1	(Jamaica) (Trinidad and Tobago)	Daniel Harris; Akiel Duke	6; 4	6; 1
2	(Jamaica) (Trinidad and Tobago)	Dominic Pagon; Vaughn Wilson	6; 4	2; 6	4; 6
3	(Jamaica) (Trinidad and Tobago)	Brandon Burke / Dominic Pagon; Akiel Duke / Vaughn Wilson	7; 5	6; 3

==== Puerto Rico vs. Trinidad and Tobago ====
Puerto Rico
3
Palmas Athletic Club, Humacao, Puerto Rico
5 June 2014
Hard - Asphalt (bitumen-bound aggregate), Outdoor

Trinidad and Tobago
0

			1	2	3
1	(Puerto Rico) (Trinidad and Tobago)	Christian Garay; Akiel Duke	6; 1	6; 1
2	(Puerto Rico) (Trinidad and Tobago)	Gabriel Flores Ruiz; Javier Jovani Lewis	6; 1	6; 2
3	(Puerto Rico) (Trinidad and Tobago)	Gilberto Alvarez / Alex Llompart; Akiel Duke / Javier Jovani Lewis	6; 2	6; 4

==== Costa Rica vs. Jamaica ====
Costa Rica
3
Palmas Athletic Club, Humacao, Puerto Rico
5 June 2014
Hard - Asphalt (bitumen-bound aggregate), Outdoor

Jamaica
0

			1	2	3
1	(Costa Rica) (Jamaica)	Ignaci Roca; Brandon Burke	6; 2	6; 2
2	(Costa Rica) (Jamaica)	Pablo Nuñéz; Dominic Pagon	6; 2	7; 5
3	(Costa Rica) (Jamaica)	Alvaro Daniel Riveros / Julián Saborío; Vincenzo Ciccone / Daniel Harris	6; 4	7^{7} 6^{2}

==== Jamaica vs. Bermuda ====
Jamaica
1
Palmas Athletic Club, Humacao, Puerto Rico
6 June 2014
Hard - Asphalt (bitumen-bound aggregate), Outdoor

Bermuda
2

			1	2	3
1	(Jamaica) (Bermuda)	Daniel Harris; Gavin Manders	5; 7	0; 6
2	(Jamaica) (Bermuda)	Dominic Pagon; David Thomas	6; 3	4; 6	7^{7} 6^{3}
3	(Jamaica) (Bermuda)	Brandon Burke / Dominic Pagon; Jenson Bascome / Neal Towlson	1; 6	2; 6

==== Puerto Rico vs. Costa Rica ====
Puerto Rico
2
Palmas Athletic Club, Humacao, Puerto Rico
6 June 2014
Hard - Asphalt (bitumen-bound aggregate), Outdoor

Costa Rica
1

			1	2	3
1	(Puerto Rico) (Costa Rica)	Gabriel Flores Ruiz; Ignaci Roca	7; 5	4; 6	6; 3
2	(Puerto Rico) (Costa Rica)	Alex Llompart; Pablo Nuñéz	6; 2	6; 3
3	(Puerto Rico) (Costa Rica)	Gilberto Alvarez / Christian Garay; Alvaro Daniel Riveros / Julián Saborío	7; 5	2; 6	5; 7

== Play-offs ==
=== Promotion ===
==== Cuba vs. Costa Rica ====
Cuba
1
Palmas Athletic Club, Humacao, Puerto Rico
7 June 2014
Hard - Asphalt (bitumen-bound aggregate), Outdoor

Costa Rica
2

			1	2	3
1	(Cuba) (Costa Rica)	Randy Blanco; Ignaci Roca	7^{7} 6^{5}	6; 2
2	(Cuba) (Costa Rica)	William Dorantes Sanchez; Pablo Nuñéz	6; 4	3; 6	4; 6
3	(Cuba) (Costa Rica)	Ernesto Alfonso / Randy Blanco; Alvaro Daniel Riveros / Julián Saborío	3; 6	4; 6

==== Puerto Rico vs. Bahamas ====
Puerto Rico
2
Palmas Athletic Club, Humacao, Puerto Rico
7 June 2014
Hard - Asphalt (bitumen-bound aggregate), Outdoor

Bahamas
1

			1	2	3
1	(Puerto Rico) (The Bahamas)	Gabriel Flores Ruiz; Jamaal Adderley	6; 3	6; 4
2	(Puerto Rico) (The Bahamas)	Alex Llompart; Devin Mullings	2; 6	6; 4	3; 6
3	(Puerto Rico) (The Bahamas)	Gilberto Alvarez / Alex Llompart; Jamaal Adderley / Marvin Rolle	6; 1	5; 7	6; 1

=== 5th place play-off: Honduras vs. Bermuda ===
Honduras
2
Palmas Athletic Club, Humacao, Puerto Rico
7 June 2014
Hard - Asphalt (bitumen-bound aggregate), Outdoor

Bermuda
0

			1	2	3
1	(Honduras) (Bermuda)	Alejandro Obando; Gavin Manders	6; 4	3; 6	6; 4
2	(Honduras) (Bermuda)	Keny Turcios; Neal Towlson	6; 3	6; 0
3	(Honduras) (Bermuda)	Alejandro Obando / Keny Turcios; Jenson Bascome / Neal Towlson				not played

=== 7th place play-off: Panama vs. Jamaica ===
Panama
2
Palmas Athletic Club, Humacao, Puerto Rico
7 June 2014
Hard - Asphalt (bitumen-bound aggregate), Outdoor

Jamaica
1

			1	2	3
1	(Panama) (Jamaica)	Walner Espinoza; Vincenzo Ciccone	5; 7	6; 1	6; 0
2	(Panama) (Jamaica)	Luis Gómez; Daniel Harris	7^{8} 6^{6}	4; 6	1; 6
3	(Panama) (Jamaica)	José Gilbert Gómez / Luis Gómez; Vincenzo Ciccone / Daniel Harris	4; 6	6; 4	6; 2

== Final standings ==
Rank	Team
1	Puerto Rico
2	Costa Rica
3	Cuba
4	Bahamas
5	Honduras
6	Bermuda
7	Panama
8	Jamaica
9	Trinidad and Tobago

- Puerto Rico and Costa Rica promoted to Group II in 2015.
