= 1997 Davis Cup Americas Zone Group III =

International tennis competition

The Americas Zone was one of the three zones of the regional Davis Cup competition in 1997.

In the Americas Zone there were four different tiers, called groups, in which teams competed against each other to advance to the upper tier. The top two teams in Group III advanced to the Americas Zone Group II in 1998, whereas the bottom two teams were relegated to the Americas Zone Group IV in 1998.

== Participating nations ==
- Antigua and Barbuda
- Barbados
- Bolivia
- Dominican Republic
- Guatemala
- Jamaica
- Panama
- Trinidad and Tobago

=== Draw ===
- Venue: Southampton Princess Hotel, Southampton, Bermuda
- Date: 29 April–3 May

Group A

	PAN	ATG	TRI	BAR	RR; W–L	Match; W–L	Set; W–L	Standings
Panama		2–1	3–0	2–1	3–0	7–2 (78%)	16–5 (76%)	1
Antigua and Barbuda	1–2		3–0	2–1	2–1	6–3 (67%)	13–8 (62%)	2
Trinidad and Tobago	0–3	0–3		2–1	1–2	2–7 (22%)	6–16 (27%)	3
Barbados	1–2	1–2	1–2		0–3	3–6 (33%)	8–14 (36%)	4

Group B

	GUA	JAM	BOL	DOM	RR; W–L	Match; W–L	Set; W–L	Standings
Guatemala		2–1	3–0	1–2	2–1	6–3 (67%)	13–7 (65%)	1
Jamaica	1–2		3–0	2–1	2–1	6–3 (67%)	12–9 (57%)	2
Bolivia	0–3	0–3		2–1	1–2	2–7 (22%)	6–16 (27%)	3
Dominican Republic	2–1	1–2	1–2		1–2	4–5 (44%)	11–10 (52%)	4

1st to 4th place play-offs

3rd-4th Play-off
A1	Panama	1
A2	Antigua and Barbuda	2

Semifinals
A1	Panama	0
B2	Jamaica	3
A2	Antigua and Barbuda	1
B1	Guatemala	2

Final
B2	Jamaica	0
B1	Guatemala	3

5th to 8th place play-offs

7th-8th Play-off
A3	Trinidad and Tobago	1
A4	Barbados	2

5th-8th Play-offs
A3	Trinidad and Tobago	0
B4	Dominican Republic	3
A4	Barbados	1
B3	Bolivia	2

5th-6th Play-off
B4	Dominican Republic	2
B3	Bolivia	1

=== Final standings ===
Rank	Team
1	Guatemala
2	Jamaica
3	Antigua and Barbuda
4	Panama
5	Dominican Republic
6	Bolivia
7	Barbados
8	Trinidad and Tobago

- Guatemala and Jamaica promoted to Group II in 1998.
- Barbados and Trinidad and Tobago relegated to Group IV in 1998.

== Round robin ==
=== Group A ===
==== Antigua and Barbuda vs. Trinidad and Tobago ====
Antigua and Barbuda
3
Southampton Princess Hotel, Southampton, Bermuda
29 April 1997

Trinidad and Tobago
0

			1	2	3
1	(Antigua and Barbuda) (Trinidad and Tobago)	Fitzroy Anthony; Simon Evelyn	6^{5} 7^{7}	7; 5	6; 3
2	(Antigua and Barbuda) (Trinidad and Tobago)	Phil Williamson; Orville Adams	7; 5	6; 2
3	(Antigua and Barbuda) (Trinidad and Tobago)	John Maginley / Phil Williamson; Simon Evelyn / Ivor Grazette	6; 3	6; 2

==== Barbados vs. Panama ====
Barbados
1
Southampton Princess Hotel, Southampton, Bermuda
29 April 1997

Panama
2

			1	2	3
1	(Barbados) (Panama)	James Betts; Juan Pablo Herrera	1; 6	3; 6
2	(Barbados) (Panama)	Bernard Frost; Chadd Valdes	3; 6	1; 6
3	(Barbados) (Panama)	James Betts / Bernard Frost; Jan Gelabert / John Silva	6^{5} 7^{7}	6; 4	6; 2

==== Antigua and Barbuda vs. Barbados ====
Antigua and Barbuda
2
Southampton Princess Hotel, Southampton, Bermuda
30 April 1997

Barbados
1

			1	2	3
1	(Antigua and Barbuda) (Barbados)	Fitzroy Anthony; James Betts	1; 6	6; 3	3; 6
2	(Antigua and Barbuda) (Barbados)	Phil Williamson; Bernard Frost	6; 3	6; 4
3	(Antigua and Barbuda) (Barbados)	John Maginley / Phil Williamson; James Betts / Bernard Frost	6; 0	6; 4

==== Panama vs. Trinidad and Tobago ====
Panama
3
Southampton Princess Hotel, Southampton, Bermuda
30 April 1997

Trinidad and Tobago
0

			1	2	3
1	(Panama) (Trinidad and Tobago)	Juan Pablo Herrera; Simon Evelyn	6; 1	6; 3
2	(Panama) (Trinidad and Tobago)	Chadd Valdes; Orville Adams	7^{7} 6^{5}	6; 1
3	(Panama) (Trinidad and Tobago)	Jan Gelabert / John Silva; Ivor Grazette / Ronald Greaves	6^{1} 7^{7}	7^{7} 6^{5}	6; 4

==== Antigua and Barbuda vs. Panama ====
Antigua and Barbuda
1
Southampton Princess Hotel, Southampton, Bermuda
1 May 1997

Panama
2

			1	2	3
1	(Antigua and Barbuda) (Panama)	Fitzroy Anthony; Juan Pablo Herrera	3; 6	4; 6
2	(Antigua and Barbuda) (Panama)	Phil Williamson; Chadd Valdes	6; 1	1; 6	8; 6
3	(Antigua and Barbuda) (Panama)	Fitzroy Anthony / John Maginley; Jan Gelabert / Juan Pablo Herrera	3; 6	4; 6

==== Barbados vs. Trinidad and Tobago ====
Barbados
1
Southampton Princess Hotel, Southampton, Bermuda
1 May 1997

Trinidad and Tobago
2

			1	2	3
1	(Barbados) (Trinidad and Tobago)	James Betts; Ivor Grazette	1; 6	6; 2	1; 6
2	(Barbados) (Trinidad and Tobago)	Bernard Frost; Simon Evelyn	6; 4	7; 5
3	(Barbados) (Trinidad and Tobago)	Craig Smith / Duane Williams; Ivor Grazette / Ronald Greaves	4; 6	6; 4	2; 6

=== Group B ===
==== Bolivia vs. Dominican Republic ====
Bolivia
2
Southampton Princess Hotel, Southampton, Bermuda
29 April 1997

Dominican Republic
1

			1	2	3
1	(Bolivia) (Dominican Republic)	Carlos Martín Navarro Vergara; Sixto Camacho	2; 6	7^{7} 6^{4}	6; 3
2	(Bolivia) (Dominican Republic)	Pablo Ugarte; Rodrigo Vallejo	4; 6	2; 6
3	(Bolivia) (Dominican Republic)	Carlos Martín Navarro Vergara / Pablo Ugarte; Sixto Camacho / Rodrigo Vallejo	6^{4} 7^{7}	6; 2	6; 2

==== Guatemala vs. Jamaica ====
Guatemala
2
Southampton Princess Hotel, Southampton, Bermuda
29 April 1997

Jamaica
1

			1	2	3
1	(Guatemala) (Jamaica)	Andrés Asturias; Jermaine Smith	7^{7} 6^{2}	6; 4
2	(Guatemala) (Jamaica)	Daniel Chávez Morales; Nicholas Malcolm	6; 0	6; 3
3	(Guatemala) (Jamaica)	Luis Pérez Chete / Luis Valencia; Elvis Henry / Nicholas Malcolm	3; 6	6; 3	6; 8

==== Bolivia vs. Jamaica ====
Bolivia
0
Southampton Princess Hotel, Southampton, Bermuda
30 April 1997

Jamaica
3

			1	2	3
1	(Bolivia) (Jamaica)	Carlos Martín Navarro Vergara; Jesse Smatt	2; 6	2; 6
2	(Bolivia) (Jamaica)	Pablo Ugarte; Jermaine Smith	4; 6	4; 6
3	(Bolivia) (Jamaica)	Eduardo Kohlberg Ruíz / Carlos Martín Navarro Vergara; Elvis Henry / Nicholas Malcolm	7^{7} 6^{5}	2; 6	2; 6

==== Dominican Republic vs. Guatemala ====
Dominican Republic
2
Southampton Princess Hotel, Southampton, Bermuda
30 April 1997

Guatemala
1

			1	2	3
1	(Dominican Republic) (Guatemala)	Jorge Dueñas; Andrés Asturias	5; 7	2; 6
2	(Dominican Republic) (Guatemala)	Rodrigo Vallejo; Daniel Chávez Morales	7; 5	6; 3
3	(Dominican Republic) (Guatemala)	Sixto Camacho / Jorge Dueñas; Andrés Asturias / Luis Pérez Chete	7^{7} 6^{5}	6; 4

==== Bolivia vs. Guatemala ====
Bolivia
0
Southampton Princess Hotel, Southampton, Bermuda
1 May 1997

Guatemala
3

			1	2	3
1	(Bolivia) (Guatemala)	Carlos Martín Navarro Vergara; Andrés Asturias	4; 6	4; 6
2	(Bolivia) (Guatemala)	Pablo Ugarte; Daniel Chávez Morales	5; 7	6; 2	5; 7
3	(Bolivia) (Guatemala)	Eduardo Kohlberg Ruíz / Carlos Martín Navarro Vergara; Luis Pérez Chete / Luis Valencia	4; 6	1; 6

==== Dominican Republic vs. Jamaica ====
Dominican Republic
1
Southampton Princess Hotel, Southampton, Bermuda
1 May 1997

Jamaica
2

			1	2	3
1	(Dominican Republic) (Jamaica)	Jorge Dueñas; Jesse Smatt	3; 6	4; 6
2	(Dominican Republic) (Jamaica)	Rodrigo Vallejo; Jermaine Smith	7^{7} 6^{5}	6; 4
3	(Dominican Republic) (Jamaica)	Sixto Camacho / Rodrigo Vallejo; Nicholas Malcolm / Jermaine Smith	1; 6	6; 3	3; 6

== 1st to 4th place play-offs ==
=== Semifinals ===
==== Panama vs. Jamaica ====
Panama
0
Southampton Princess Hotel, Southampton, Bermuda
2 May 1997

Jamaica
3

			1	2	3
1	(Panama) (Jamaica)	Juan Pablo Herrera; Jesse Smatt	4; 6	6; 2	2; 6
2	(Panama) (Jamaica)	Chadd Valdes; Jermaine Smith	7; 5	5; 7	4; 6
3	(Panama) (Jamaica)	Jan Gelabert / John Silva; Elvis Henry / Nicholas Malcolm	3; 6	3; 6

==== Antigua and Barbuda vs. Guatemala ====
Antigua and Barbuda
1
Southampton Princess Hotel, Southampton, Bermuda
2 May 1997

Guatemala
2

			1	2	3
1	(Antigua and Barbuda) (Guatemala)	Fitzroy Anthony; Andrés Asturias	3; 6	1; 6
2	(Antigua and Barbuda) (Guatemala)	Phil Williamson; Daniel Chávez Morales	6; 3	6^{2} 7^{7}	6; 2
3	(Antigua and Barbuda) (Guatemala)	John Maginley / Phil Williamson; Andrés Asturias / Luis Pérez Chete	3; 6	7; 5	4; 6

=== Final ===
==== Jamaica vs. Guatemala ====
Jamaica
0
Southampton Princess Hotel, Southampton, Bermuda
3 May 1997

Guatemala
3

			1	2	3
1	(Jamaica) (Guatemala)	Jesse Smatt; Andrés Asturias	0; 6	7; 5	4; 6
2	(Jamaica) (Guatemala)	Jermaine Smith; Daniel Chávez Morales	5; 7	1; 6
3	(Jamaica) (Guatemala)	Elvis Henry / Nicholas Malcolm; Daniel Chávez Morales / Luis Pérez Chete	6^{4} 7^{7}	1; 6

=== 3rd to 4th play-off ===
==== Panama vs. Antigua and Barbuda ====
Panama
1
Southampton Princess Hotel, Southampton, Bermuda
3 May 1997

Antigua and Barbuda
2

			1	2	3
1	(Panama) (Antigua and Barbuda)	Juan Pablo Herrera; John Maginley	6; 2	6; 0
2	(Panama) (Antigua and Barbuda)	Chadd Valdes; Phil Williamson	4; 6	1; 6
3	(Panama) (Antigua and Barbuda)	Jan Gelabert / Juan Pablo Herrera; Fitzroy Anthony / Phil Williamson	6; 3	3; 6	0; 6

== 5th to 8th place play-offs ==
=== 5th to 8th play-offs ===
==== Trinidad and Tobago vs. Dominican Republic ====
Trinidad and Tobago
0
Southampton Princess Hotel, Southampton, Bermuda
2 May 1997

Dominican Republic
3

			1	2	3
1	(Trinidad and Tobago) (Dominican Republic)	Ivor Grazette; Sixto Camacho	4; 6	2; 6
2	(Trinidad and Tobago) (Dominican Republic)	Simon Evelyn; Rodrigo Vallejo	3; 6	3; 6
3	(Trinidad and Tobago) (Dominican Republic)	Ivor Grazette / Ronald Greaves; Sixto Camacho / Jorge Dueñas	5; 7	3; 6

==== Barbados vs. Bolivia ====
Barbados
1
Southampton Princess Hotel, Southampton, Bermuda
2 May 1997

Bolivia
2

			1	2	3
1	(Barbados) (Bolivia)	James Betts; Carlos Martín Navarro Vergara	3; 6	3; 6
2	(Barbados) (Bolivia)	Bernard Frost; Pablo Ugarte	6; 4	0; 6	1; 6
3	(Barbados) (Bolivia)	James Betts / Duane Williams; Eduardo Kohlberg Ruíz / Pablo Ugarte	2; 6	6; 4	6; 3

=== 5th to 6th play-off ===
==== Dominican Republic vs. Bolivia ====
Dominican Republic
2
Southampton Princess Hotel, Southampton, Bermuda
3 May 1997

Bolivia
1

			1	2	3
1	(Dominican Republic) (Bolivia)	Jorge Dueñas; Carlos Martín Navarro Vergara	6; 2	5; 7	1; 6
2	(Dominican Republic) (Bolivia)	Rodrigo Vallejo; Pablo Ugarte	5; 7	6; 4	6; 1
3	(Dominican Republic) (Bolivia)	Sixto Camacho / Rodrigo Vallejo; Carlos Martín Navarro Vergara / Pablo Ugarte	6; 4	6^{5} 7^{7}	6; 4

=== 7th to 8th play-off ===
==== Trinidad and Tobago vs. Barbados ====
Trinidad and Tobago
1
Southampton Princess Hotel, Southampton, Bermuda
3 May 1997

Barbados
2

			1	2	3
1	(Trinidad and Tobago) (Barbados)	Ivor Grazette; Duane Williams	4; 6	6^{4} 7^{7}
2	(Trinidad and Tobago) (Barbados)	Orville Adams; James Betts	5; 3			retired
3	(Trinidad and Tobago) (Barbados)	Simon Evelyn / Ronald Greaves; James Betts / Duane Williams	6; 2	7; 5
