= 1997 Davis Cup Americas Zone Group IV =

International tennis competition

The Americas Zone was one of the three zones of the regional Davis Cup competition in 1997.

In the Americas Zone there were four different tiers, called groups, in which teams competed against each other to advance to the upper tier. The top two teams in Group IV advanced to the Americas Zone Group III in 1998. All other teams remained in Group IV.

== Participating nations ==
- Bermuda
- Costa Rica
- Eastern Caribbean

=== Draw ===
- Venue: Southampton Princess Hotel, Southampton, Bermuda
- Date: 1–3 May

	BER	CRC	ECA	RR; W–L	Match; W–L	Set; W–L	Standings
Bermuda		2–1	2–1	2–0	4–2 (67%)	9–5 (64%)	1
Costa Rica	1–2		2–1	1–1	3–3 (50%)	6–8 (43%)	2
Eastern Caribbean	1–2	1–2		0–2	2–4 (25%)	5–7 (42%)	3

- Bermuda and Costa Rica promoted to Group III in 1998.

== Results ==
=== Bermuda vs. Costa Rica ===
Bermuda
2
Southampton Princess Hotel, Southampton, Bermuda
1 May 1997

Costa Rica
1

			1	2	3
1	(Bermuda) (Costa Rica)	Richard Mallory; Fernando Martínez Manrique	6; 3	7; 5
2	(Bermuda) (Costa Rica)	Donald Evans; Federico Camacho	2; 6	7^{7} 6^{2}	6; 4
3	(Bermuda) (Costa Rica)	James Collieson / Michael Way; Martin Echandi / Javier Solera	6^{2} 7^{7}	6; 3	4; 6

=== Costa Rica vs. Eastern Caribbean ===
Costa Rica
2
Southampton Princess Hotel, Southampton, Bermuda
2 May 1997

Eastern Caribbean
1

			1	2	3
1	(Costa Rica) (Eastern Caribbean)	Javier Solera; Glynn James	2; 6	4; 6
2	(Costa Rica) (Eastern Caribbean)	Federico Camacho; Vernon Lewis	0; 6	7; 5	6; 3
3	(Costa Rica) (Eastern Caribbean)	Martin Echandi / Fernando Martínez Manrique; Gary Eugene / Glynn James	7; 5	1; 3		retired

=== Bermuda vs. Eastern Caribbean ===
Bermuda
2
Southampton Princess Hotel, Southampton, Bermuda
3 May 1993

Eastern Caribbean
1

			1	2	3
1	(Bermuda) (Eastern Caribbean)	James Collieson; Gary Eugene	6; 2	6; 2
2	(Bermuda) (Eastern Caribbean)	Donald Evans; Vernon Lewis	2; 6	2; 6
3	(Bermuda) (Eastern Caribbean)	Richard Mallory / Michael Way; Gary Eugene / Vernon Lewis	7; 5	7^{7} 6^{4}
