= John Maginley =

Antiguan politician

John Maginley MP

Member of the House of Representatives of Antigua and Barbuda
- In office 23 March 2004 – 26 April 2014
- Preceded by: Bernard Percival
- Succeeded by: Charles Fernandez
- Constituency: St. John's Rural North

Personal details
- Party: United Progressive Party

John Maginley is an Antiguan United Progressive Party politician, who was elected as Member of Parliament for St. John's Rural North in the 2004 and 2009 general elections.
