= Diego Camacho (tennis) =

Bolivian tennis player

- Country (sports): Bolivia
- Born: May 21, 1983 (age 41); Santa Cruz de la Sierra

Singles
- Career record: 4–5 (Davis Cup)
- Highest ranking: No. 954 (March 19, 2001)

Doubles
- Career record: 5–5 (Davis Cup)
- Highest ranking: No. 1340 (April 26, 1999)

Diego Camacho (born May 21, 1983) is a tennis player from Bolivia, who represented his native country at the 2000 Summer Olympics in Sydney. There he was defeated in the first round by America's Jeff Tarango. Camacho reached his highest singles ATP-ranking on March 19, 2001, when he became the number 954 of the world. Camacho played collegiate tennis for the University of Tulsa.

Camacho played for the Bolivian Davis Cup team from 2001 to 2008, posting a 4–5 record in singles and a 5–5 record in doubles.

As of late 2007, Camacho has been working at a Fitness Center in Joplin, Missouri. In 2007 he coached the boys tennis team of Thomas Jefferson Independent Day School and led them to the state championships.

Camacho was the Bolivian Davis Cup Captain in 2009.

Camacho worked with professional tennis player Arnau Brugues from Spain as his personal tennis coach from May 2009 to July 2010 on the ATP professional circuit.
