= Gabriel Montilla =

Puerto Rican tennis player

- Country (sports): Puerto Rico
- Born: 11 August 1979 (age 45)
- Prize money: $11,921

Singles
- Career record: 21–7 (Davis Cup)
- Highest ranking: No. 673 (9 Dec 2002)

Doubles
- Career record: 17–8 (Davis Cup)
- Highest ranking: No. 692 (28 Oct 2002)
Medal record
Central American and Caribbean Games
| Gold medal – first place | 2002 San Salvador | Mixed Doubles |

Gabriel Montilla (born 11 August 1979) is a Puerto Rican former professional tennis player.

Before competing on the professional tour, Montilla played collegiate tennis for the Indiana Hoosiers.

Montilla is Puerto Rico's most successful Davis Cup player in history, with 38 overall wins, 21 in singles and 17 in doubles. His Davis Cup career, which included 33 ties, was played from 1999 to 2006, before a final comeback appearance in 2015.

At the 2002 Central American and Caribbean Games, Montilla was a mixed doubles gold medalist partnering Kristina Brandi. They won the final against the Mexican pairing of Santiago González and Melissa Torres Sandoval.

Montilla represented Puerto Rico at the 2003 Pan American Games in Santo Domingo and was eliminated from the singles draw in unusual circumstances. After winning his first two matches, he was due to meet Brazil's Fernando Meligeni in the third round, but didn't arrive to court on time and was defaulted. He had mistakenly thought the match was scheduled for the following day.
