= Eastern Caribbean Davis Cup team =

Tennis team

Eastern Caribbean
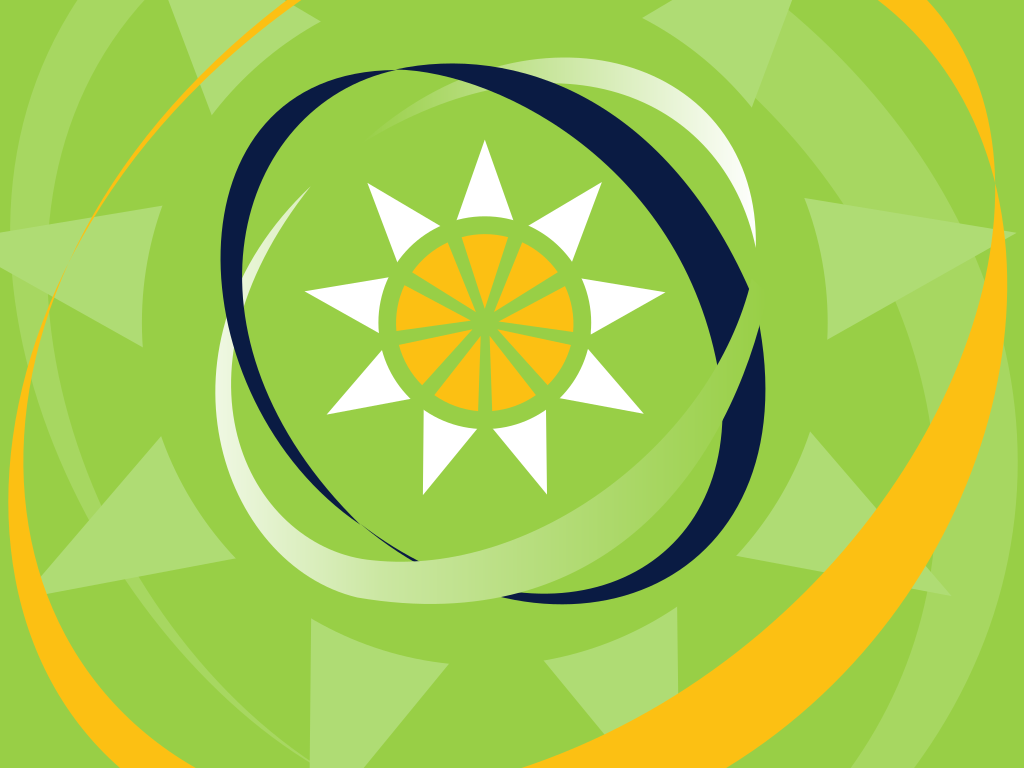
- First year: 1991
- Years played: 12

The Eastern Caribbean Davis Cup team represented member nations of the Organization of Eastern Caribbean States in Davis Cup tennis competition.

The team represents full members of the Organisation of Eastern Caribbean States (OECS) and associate members whose population does not exceed 200,000.

Eastern Caribbean have not competed since 2004. They reached the quarterfinals of Group II in 1991.

== History ==
Eastern Caribbean competed in its first Davis Cup in 1991. Players from member nations previously competed on the Caribbean/West Indies team.

== Last team (2004) ==
- (Saint Kitts and Nevis) Dexter Christian
- (Saint Vincent and the Grenadines) Corey Huggins
- (Grenada) Hayden Ashton
- (Saint Lucia) Glynn James (Captain-player)

== Nations and Territories represented ==
- Anguilla
- Antigua and Barbuda (1991-1995)
- British Virgin Islands
- Dominica
- Grenada
- Montserrat
- Saint Kitts and Nevis
- Saint Lucia (1991-1997 & 2007-2022)
- Saint Vincent and the Grenadines

== See also ==
- Davis Cup
- Eastern Caribbean Billie Jean King Cup team
