= Panama Davis Cup team =

National tennis team

The Panama men's national tennis team represents Panama in Davis Cup tennis competition and are governed by the Federación Panamena de Tenis.

Panama currently compete in the Americas Zone of Group III. They have finished 3rd in Group III on two occasions.

== History ==
Panama competed in its first Davis Cup in 1996.

== Current team (2022) ==
- José Gilbert Gómez
- Luis Gómez
- Marcelo Rodríguez
- Jorge Daniel Chevez
- Chad Valdés Jr. (Junior player)

== See also ==
- Davis Cup
- Panama Billie Jean King Cup team
