= El Salvador Davis Cup team =

National men's tennis team

El Salvador
- ITF ranking: 66 ▼2 (20 September 2021)
- Colors: blue & white
- First year: 1991
- Years played: 24
- Ties played (W–L): 87 (51-36)
- Years in World Group: 0
- Most total wins: Rafael Arévalo (50)
- Most singles wins: Rafael Arévalo (31)
- Most doubles wins: Rafael Arévalo (19)
- Best doubles team: Marcelo Arévalo/Rafael Arévalo (10-6)
- Most ties played: Manuel-Antonio Tejada-Ruiz (45)
- Most years played: Manuel-Antonio Tejada-Ruiz (13)

The El Salvador national tennis team represents El Salvador in the Davis Cup tennis competition and are governed by the Federación Salvadorena de Ténis.

El Salvador currently competes in the Americas Zone of Group II. They have reached Group II on four occasions, and won their first ever Group II match in April 2007 to avoid relegation.

== History ==
El Salvador competed in its first Davis Cup in 1991.

== Current team ==
The team for the 2022 Davis Cup was:

- Marcelo Arévalo
- César Cruz
- Lluis Miralles
- Diego Durán
- Kyle Johnson

== See also ==
- Davis Cup
- El Salvador Billie Jean King Cup team
