= Trinidad and Tobago Davis Cup team =

National tennis team

The Trinidad and Tobago men's national tennis team represents Trinidad and Tobago in Davis Cup tennis competition and are governed by Tennis TT.

Trinidad and Tobago have appeared in Group II on three occasions, but have yet to win a match at that level. They have not competed since 2016.

== History ==
Trinidad and Tobago competed in its first Davis Cup in 1990.

== Current team (2022) ==
- Nabeel Majeed Mohammed
- Ebolum Pastor Nwokolo
- Joseph Cadogan
- Akiel Duke
- Luca Shamsi (Junior player)

== See also ==
- Davis Cup
- Trinidad and Tobago Billie Jean King Cup team
