= Costa Rica Davis Cup team =

Costa Rican national tennis team

The Costa Rica men's national tennis team represents Costa Rica in Davis Cup tennis competition and are governed by the Federación Costarricense de Tenis.

Costa Rica currently compete in the Americas Zone of Group III. They have reached Group II on six occasions, but have yet to win a match at that level.

== History ==
Costa Rica competed in its first Davis Cup in 1990.

== Current team (2022) ==
- Jesse Flores
- Sebastián Quiros
- Pablo Núñez
- Julián Lozardo
- Luca Lo Nardo

== See also ==
- Davis Cup
- Costa Rica Billie Jean King Cup team
