= Puerto Rico Davis Cup team =

National sports team

The Puerto Rico men's national tennis team represents Puerto Rico in Davis Cup tennis competition and are governed by the Asociación de Tenis de Puerto Rico.

Puerto Rico currently compete in the Americas Zone of Group III. They reached the Group II final in 1993.

== History ==
Puerto Rico competed in its first Davis Cup in 1992.

== Current team (2022) ==
- Christian Garay
- Ignacio García
- Alex Llompart (Captain-player)
- Juan Enrique Marrero
- Alex Aguiar

== See also ==
- Davis Cup
- Puerto Rico Billie Jean King Cup team
