= Bolivia Davis Cup team =

National sports team

The Bolivia national tennis team represents Bolivia in Davis Cup tennis competition and are governed by the Federación Boliviana de Tenis.

Bolivia currently compete in the Americas Zone of Group II. They have reached Group II on eight occasions.

== History ==
Bolivia competed in its first Davis Cup in 1971.

== Current team (2024) ==
- Hugo Dellien (singles)
- Murkel Dellien (singles)
- Juan Carlos Prado (singles)
- Federico Zeballos (doubles)
- Boris Arias (doubles)

== See also ==
- Davis Cup
- Bolivia Billie Jean King Cup team
