= 2019 Davis Cup Americas Zone Group III =

International tennis competition

The Americas Zone was the unique zone within Group 3 of the regional Davis Cup competition in 2019. The zone's competition was held in round robin format in Escazú, Costa Rica, from 17 to 22 June 2019.

== Participating nations ==
- Antigua and Barbuda
- Bahamas
- Bermuda
- Costa Rica
- Cuba
- Honduras
- Jamaica
- Panama
- Puerto Rico
- Trinidad and Tobago
- U.S. Virgin Islands

=== Inactive nations ===
- Aruba
- Eastern Caribbean
- Haiti
- Saint Lucia

== Draw ==
Date: 17–22 June

Location: Costa Rica Country Club, Escazú, Costa Rica (hard)

Format: Round-robin basis.

=== Seeding ===
Pot	Nation	Rank^{1}	Seed
1	Bahamas	77	1
1	Honduras	82	2
2	Puerto Rico	84	3
2	Jamaica	86	4
3	Costa Rica	89	5
3	Cuba	98	6
4	Panama	109	7
4	Antigua and Barbuda	115	8
5	Bermuda	118	9
5	Trinidad and Tobago	130	10
5	U.S. Virgin Islands	NR	11

- ^{1}Davis Cup Rankings as of 4 February 2019

=== Round Robin ===
==== Pool A ====
		CRC	PUR	BAH	ANT	ISV	RR; W–L	Set; W–L	Game; W–L	Standings
5	Costa Rica		2–1	3–0	2–1	3–0	4–0	21–5 (81%)	143–90 (61%)	1
3	Puerto Rico	1–2		3–0	3–0	3–0	3–1	20–4 (83%)	137–69 (67%)	2
1	Bahamas	0–3	0–3		2–1	2–1	2–2	9–16 (36%)	103–115 (47%)	3
8	Antigua and Barbuda	1–2	0–3	1–2		3–0	1–3	10–15 (40%)	90–117 (43%)	4
11	U.S. Virgin Islands	0–3	0–3	1–2	0–3		0–4	2–22 (8%)	61–143 (30%)	5

==== Pool B ====
		JAM	CUB	HON	PAN	BER	TTO	RR; W–L	Set; W–L	Game; W–L	Standings
4	Jamaica		2–1	2–1	2–1	2–1	2–1	5–0	24–12 (67%)	189–146 (56%)	1
6	Cuba	1–2		1–2	2–1	3–0	3–0	3–2	23–11 (68%)	175–149 (54%)	2
2	Honduras	1–2	2–1		1–2	2–1	3–0	3–2	21–14 (60%)	187–143 (57%)	3
7	Panama	1–2	1–2	2–1		2–1	2–1	3–2	18–17 (51%)	169–156 (52%)	4
9	Bermuda	1–2	0–3	1–2	1–2		2–1	1–4	11–22 (33%)	126–173 (42%)	5
10	Trinidad and Tobago	1–2	0–3	0–3	1–2	1–2		0–5	6–27 (18%)	106–185 (36%)	6

Standings are determined by: 1. number of wins; 2. number of matches; 3. in two-team ties, head-to-head records; 4. in three-team ties, (a) percentage of sets won (head-to-head records if two teams remain tied), then (b) percentage of games won (head-to-head records if two teams remain tied), then (c) Davis Cup rankings.

=== Playoffs ===
Placing	A Team	Score	B Team
1st–2nd	Costa Rica	2–0	Jamaica
3rd–4th	Puerto Rico	2–0	Cuba
5th–6th	Bahamas	0–2	Honduras
7th–8th	Antigua and Barbuda	2–1	Panama
9th–10th	U.S. Virgin Islands	1–2	Bermuda
11th	—N/a		Trinidad and Tobago

== Round Robin ==
=== Pool A ===
==== Bahamas vs. Antigua and Barbuda ====
Bahamas
2
Costa Rica Country Club, Escazú, Costa Rica
17 June
Hard

Antigua and Barbuda
1

			1	2	3
1	(The Bahamas) (Antigua and Barbuda)	Philip Wilbert Major; Shakir Elvin	6; 1	6; 3
2	(The Bahamas) (Antigua and Barbuda)	Baker Newman; Jody Maginley	1; 6	3; 6
3	(The Bahamas) (Antigua and Barbuda)	Philip Wilbert Major / Baker Newman; Carlton Bedminster / Jody Maginley	6; 2	6; 3

==== Puerto Rico vs. Costa Rica ====
Puerto Rico
1
Costa Rica Country Club, Escazú, Costa Rica
17 June
Hard

Costa Rica
2

			1	2	3
1	(Puerto Rico) (Costa Rica)	Quinton Vega; Sebastián Quirós	3; 6	4; 6
2	(Puerto Rico) (Costa Rica)	Alex Díaz; Jesse Flores	1; 6	5; 7
3	(Puerto Rico) (Costa Rica)	Alex Díaz / Ignacio García; Rodrigo Crespo Piedra / Pablo Núñez	6; 1	7^{8} 6^{6}

==== Puerto Rico vs. U.S. Virgin Islands ====
Puerto Rico
3
Costa Rica Country Club, Escazú, Costa Rica
18 June
Hard

U.S. Virgin Islands
0

			1	2	3
1	(Puerto Rico) (United States Virgin Islands)	Ignacio García; Tomas del Olmo	6; 1	6; 0
2	(Puerto Rico) (United States Virgin Islands)	Alex Díaz; Kristepher Elien	7^{7} 6^{2}	6; 2
3	(Puerto Rico) (United States Virgin Islands)	Sebastián Arcila / Quinton Vega; Russell Armstrong / Tomas del Olmo	6; 2	6; 1

==== Costa Rica vs. Antigua and Barbuda ====
Costa Rica
2
Costa Rica Country Club, Escazú, Costa Rica
18 June
Hard

Antigua and Barbuda
1

			1	2	3
1	(Costa Rica) (Antigua and Barbuda)	Sebastián Quirós; Kyle Joseph	6; 1	6; 2
2	(Costa Rica) (Antigua and Barbuda)	Jesse Flores; Jody Maginley	6; 4	1; 6	4; 6
3	(Costa Rica) (Antigua and Barbuda)	Jesse Flores / Pablo Núñez; Carlton Bedminster / Jody Maginley	6; 1	6; 4

==== Bahamas vs. Costa Rica ====
Bahamas
0
Costa Rica Country Club, Escazú, Costa Rica
19 June
Hard

Costa Rica
3

			1	2	3
1	(The Bahamas) (Costa Rica)	Philip Wilbert Major; Sebastián Quirós	4; 6	3; 6
2	(The Bahamas) (Costa Rica)	Baker Newman; Jesse Flores	6; 3	3; 6	2; 6
3	(The Bahamas) (Costa Rica)	Donte Armbrister / Justin Lunn; Rodrigo Crespo Piedra / Pablo Núñez	4; 6	4; 6

==== Antigua and Barbuda vs. U.S. Virgin Islands ====
Antigua and Barbuda
3
Costa Rica Country Club, Escazú, Costa Rica
19 June
Hard

U.S. Virgin Islands
0

			1	2	3
1	(Antigua and Barbuda) (United States Virgin Islands)	Shakir Elvin; Russell Armstrong	6; 2	6; 1
2	(Antigua and Barbuda) (United States Virgin Islands)	Jody Maginley; Tomas del Olmo	6; 1	6; 4
3	(Antigua and Barbuda) (United States Virgin Islands)	Carlton Bedminster / Kyle Joseph; Russell Armstrong / Tomas del Olmo	6; 4	7^{7} 6^{3}

==== Bahamas vs. U.S. Virgin Islands ====
Bahamas
2
Costa Rica Country Club, Escazú, Costa Rica
20 June
Hard

U.S. Virgin Islands
1

			1	2	3
1	(The Bahamas) (United States Virgin Islands)	Philip Wilbert Major; Russell Armstrong	6; 0	6; 2
2	(The Bahamas) (United States Virgin Islands)	Baker Newman; Tomas del Olmo	6; 0	6; 2
3	(The Bahamas) (United States Virgin Islands)	Donte Armbrister / Justin Lunn; Nicholas Bass / Kristepher Elien	3; 6	5; 7

==== Puerto Rico vs. Antigua and Barbuda ====
Puerto Rico
3
Costa Rica Country Club, Escazú, Costa Rica
20 June
Hard

Antigua and Barbuda
0

			1	2	3
1	(Puerto Rico) (Antigua and Barbuda)	Ignacio García; Kyle Joseph	6; 0	6; 2
2	(Puerto Rico) (Antigua and Barbuda)	Quinton Vega; Jody Maginley	6; 3	6; 1
3	(Puerto Rico) (Antigua and Barbuda)	Sebastián Arcila / Alex Díaz; Carlton Bedminster / Shakir Elvin	6; 2	1; 0		retired

==== Bahamas vs. Puerto Rico ====
Bahamas
0
Costa Rica Country Club, Escazú, Costa Rica
21 June
Hard

Puerto Rico
3

			1	2	3
1	(The Bahamas) (Puerto Rico)	Philip Wilbert Major; Ignacio García	0; 6	3; 6
2	(The Bahamas) (Puerto Rico)	Baker Newman; Alex Díaz	2; 6	5; 7
3	(The Bahamas) (Puerto Rico)	Donte Armbrister / Justin Lunn; Sebastián Arcila / Quinton Vega	6^{5} 7^{7}	1; 6

==== Costa Rica vs. U.S. Virgin Islands ====
Costa Rica
3
Costa Rica Country Club, Escazú, Costa Rica
21 June
Hard

U.S. Virgin Islands
0

			1	2	3
1	(Costa Rica) (United States Virgin Islands)	Sebastián Quirós; Russell Armstrong	6; 1	6; 1
2	(Costa Rica) (United States Virgin Islands)	Jesse Flores; Tomas del Olmo	6; 2	6; 1
3	(Costa Rica) (United States Virgin Islands)	Rodrigo Crespo Piedra / Pablo Núñez; Russell Armstrong / Tomas del Olmo	6; 3	7^{7} 6^{5}

=== Pool B ===
==== Honduras vs. Bermuda ====
Honduras
2
Costa Rica Country Club, Escazú, Costa Rica
17 June
Hard

Bermuda
1

			1	2	3
1	(Honduras) (Bermuda)	Keny Turcios; Gavin Manders	6; 0	6; 2
2	(Honduras) (Bermuda)	Jaime Bendeck; Neal Towlson	6; 3	6; 4
3	(Honduras) (Bermuda)	Alejandro Obando / Keny Turcios; Gavin Manders / Neal Towlson	5; 7	4; 6

==== Jamaica vs. Panama ====
Jamaica
2
Costa Rica Country Club, Escazú, Costa Rica
17 June
Hard

Panama
1

			1	2	3
1	(Jamaica) (Panama)	Jacob Bicknell; Marcelo Rodríguez	2; 6	6; 3	1; 6
2	(Jamaica) (Panama)	Rowland Phillips; José Gilbert Gómez	6; 3	6; 2
3	(Jamaica) (Panama)	Dominic Pagon / Rowland Phillips; Jorge Daniel Chévez / Luis Gómez	6; 2	6; 1

==== Cuba vs. Trinidad and Tobago ====
Cuba
3
Costa Rica Country Club, Escazú, Costa Rica
17 June
Hard

Trinidad and Tobago
0

			1	2	3
1	(Cuba) (Trinidad and Tobago)	Maykol Ponte Suárez; Nabeel Majeed Mohammed	6; 3	6; 1
2	(Cuba) (Trinidad and Tobago)	Osmel Rivera Granja; Akiel Duke	6; 2	7^{7} 6^{5}
3	(Cuba) (Trinidad and Tobago)	Osmel Rivera Granja / Osviel Turino; Richard Chung / Nabeel Majeed Mohammed	6; 2	6; 1

==== Honduras vs. Cuba ====
Honduras
2
Costa Rica Country Club, Escazú, Costa Rica
18 June
Hard

Cuba
1

			1	2	3
1	(Honduras) (Cuba)	Alejandro Obando; Osviel Turino	6; 3	6; 1
2	(Honduras) (Cuba)	Keny Turcios; Osmel Rivera Granja	6; 2	3; 6	6; 2
3	(Honduras) (Cuba)	Alejandro Obando / Gabriel Zúñiga Mendoza; Yoan Pérez / Osviel Turino	6^{2} 7^{7}	6; 3	6^{4} 7^{7}

==== Jamaica vs. Trinidad and Tobago ====
Jamaica
2
Costa Rica Country Club, Escazú, Costa Rica
18 June
Hard

Trinidad and Tobago
1

			1	2	3
1	(Jamaica) (Trinidad and Tobago)	Dimitri Bird; Nabeel Majeed Mohammed	6^{8} 7^{10}	7; 5	3; 6
2	(Jamaica) (Trinidad and Tobago)	Rowland Phillips; Akiel Duke	6; 1	6; 1
3	(Jamaica) (Trinidad and Tobago)	Dominic Pagon / Rowland Phillips; Akiel Duke / Nabeel Majeed Mohammed	6; 3	7^{7} 6^{0}

==== Panama vs. Bermuda ====
Panama
2
Costa Rica Country Club, Escazú, Costa Rica
18 June
Hard

Bermuda
1

			1	2	3
1	(Panama) (Bermuda)	Marcelo Rodríguez; Richard Mallory	6; 4	6; 2
2	(Panama) (Bermuda)	José Gilbert Gómez; Gavin Manders	1; 6	6; 3	5; 7
3	(Panama) (Bermuda)	Luis Gómez / Marcelo Rodríguez; Gavin Manders / Neal Towlson	6; 2	6; 4

==== Honduras vs. Trinidad and Tobago ====
Honduras
3
Costa Rica Country Club, Escazú, Costa Rica
19 June
Hard

Trinidad and Tobago
0

			1	2	3
1	(Honduras) (Trinidad and Tobago)	Alejandro Obando; Nabeel Majeed Mohammed	6; 2	6; 1
2	(Honduras) (Trinidad and Tobago)	Keny Turcios; Richard Chung	6; 2	6; 1
3	(Honduras) (Trinidad and Tobago)	Keny Turcios / Gabriel Zúñiga Mendoza; Akiel Duke / Nabeel Majeed Mohammed	7; 5	6; 4

==== Jamaica vs. Bermuda ====
Jamaica
2
Costa Rica Country Club, Escazú, Costa Rica
19 June
Hard

Bermuda
1

			1	2	3
1	(Jamaica) (Bermuda)	Jacob Bicknell; Richard Mallory	7^{7} 6^{2}	3; 6	6^{4} 7^{7}
2	(Jamaica) (Bermuda)	Rowland Phillips; Tariq Simons	6; 2	6; 2
3	(Jamaica) (Bermuda)	Dominic Pagon / Rowland Phillips; Gavin Manders / Neal Towlson	6; 1	6; 3

==== Cuba vs. Panama ====
Cuba
2
Costa Rica Country Club, Escazú, Costa Rica
19 June
Hard

Panama
1

			1	2	3
1	(Cuba) (Panama)	Maykol Ponte Suárez; Marcelo Rodríguez	6; 4	2; 6	3; 6
2	(Cuba) (Panama)	Osmel Rivera Granja; Jorge Daniel Chévez	7^{7} 6^{4}	6; 3
3	(Cuba) (Panama)	Yoan Pérez / Osmel Rivera Granja; Luis Gómez / Marcelo Rodríguez	7^{8} 6^{6}	7; 5

==== Honduras vs. Panama ====
Honduras
1
Costa Rica Country Club, Escazú, Costa Rica
20 June
Hard

Panama
2

			1	2	3
1	(Honduras) (Panama)	Alejandro Obando; Luis Gómez	6^{2} 7^{7}	7^{7} 6^{5}	4; 6
2	(Honduras) (Panama)	Keny Turcios; Marcelo Rodríguez	5; 7	3; 6
3	(Honduras) (Panama)	Jaime Bendeck / Keny Turcios; Jorge Daniel Chévez / José Gilbert Gómez	7^{7} 6^{5}	6; 1

==== Jamaica vs. Cuba ====
Jamaica
2
Costa Rica Country Club, Escazú, Costa Rica
20 June
Hard

Cuba
1

			1	2	3
1	(Jamaica) (Cuba)	Jacob Bicknell; Osviel Turino	6; 4	6; 3
2	(Jamaica) (Cuba)	Rowland Phillips; Osmel Rivera Granja	6; 2	5; 7	6; 4
3	(Jamaica) (Cuba)	Dimitri Bird / Dominic Pagon; Yoan Pérez / Osmel Rivera Granja	4; 6	6^{5} 7^{7}

==== Bermuda vs. Trinidad and Tobago ====
Bermuda
2
Costa Rica Country Club, Escazú, Costa Rica
20 June
Hard

Trinidad and Tobago
1

			1	2	3
1	(Bermuda) (Trinidad and Tobago)	Gavin Manders; Akiel Duke	6; 3	6; 3
2	(Bermuda) (Trinidad and Tobago)	Neal Towlson; Richard Chung	6; 3	6; 4
3	(Bermuda) (Trinidad and Tobago)	Gavin Manders / Tariq Simons; Akiel Duke / Nabeel Majeed Mohammed	1; 6	6; 3	4; 6

==== Honduras vs. Jamaica ====
Honduras
1
Costa Rica Country Club, Escazú, Costa Rica
21 June
Hard

Jamaica
2

			1	2	3
1	(Honduras) (Jamaica)	Alejandro Obando; Jacob Bicknell	6; 1	4; 6	3; 6
2	(Honduras) (Jamaica)	Jaime Bendeck; Rowland Phillips	4; 6	1; 6
3	(Honduras) (Jamaica)	Keny Turcios / Gabriel Zúñiga Mendoza; Dimitri Bird / Dominic Pagon	4; 6	6; 1	6; 4

==== Cuba vs. Bermuda ====
Cuba
3
Costa Rica Country Club, Escazú, Costa Rica
21 June
Hard

Bermuda
0

			1	2	3
1	(Cuba) (Bermuda)	Maykol Ponte Suárez; Richard Mallory	6; 3	6; 0
2	(Cuba) (Bermuda)	Osmel Rivera Granja; Tariq Simons	6; 1	6; 3
3	(Cuba) (Bermuda)	Yoan Pérez / Osmel Rivera Granja; Gavin Manders / Neal Towlson	6; 4	6; 3

==== Panama vs. Trinidad and Tobago ====
Panama
2
Costa Rica Country Club, Escazú, Costa Rica
21 June
Hard

Trinidad and Tobago
1

			1	2	3
1	(Panama) (Trinidad and Tobago)	Luis Gómez; Nabeel Majeed Mohammed	6; 1	2; 6	3; 6
2	(Panama) (Trinidad and Tobago)	Marcelo Rodríguez; Akiel Duke	6; 0	6; 2
3	(Panama) (Trinidad and Tobago)	Jorge Daniel Chévez / Marcelo Rodríguez; Akiel Duke / Nabeel Majeed Mohammed	6; 1	6; 3

== Playoffs ==
=== 1st to 2nd playoff ===
==== Costa Rica vs. Jamaica ====
Costa Rica
2
Costa Rica Country Club, Escazú, Costa Rica
22 June
Hard

Jamaica
0

			1	2	3
1	(Costa Rica) (Jamaica)	Sebastián Quirós; Dimitri Bird	6; 2	6; 2
2	(Costa Rica) (Jamaica)	Jesse Flores; Jacob Bicknell	6; 3	6; 3
3	(Costa Rica) (Jamaica)	Rodrigo Crespo Piedra / Pablo Núñez; Jacob Bicknell / Dimitri Bird				not played

=== 3rd to 4th playoff ===
==== Puerto Rico vs. Cuba ====
Puerto Rico
2
Costa Rica Country Club, Escazú, Costa Rica
22 June
Hard

Cuba
0

			1	2	3
1	(Puerto Rico) (Cuba)	Ignacio García; Maykol Ponte Suárez	6; 2	6; 3
2	(Puerto Rico) (Cuba)	Quinton Vega; Osmel Rivera Granja	6; 4	6; 2
3	(Puerto Rico) (Cuba)	Ignacio García / Quinton Vega; Yoan Pérez / Osmel Rivera Granja				not played

=== 5th to 6th playoff ===
==== Bahamas vs. Honduras ====
Bahamas
0
Costa Rica Country Club, Escazú, Costa Rica
22 June
Hard

Honduras
2

			1	2	3
1	(The Bahamas) (Honduras)	Donte Armbrister; Gabriel Zúñiga Mendoza	3; 6	1; 6
2	(The Bahamas) (Honduras)	Justin Lunn; Keny Turcios	5; 7	6; 1	0; 6
3	(The Bahamas) (Honduras)	Philip Wilbert Major / Baker Newman; Jaime Bendeck / Alejandro Obando				not played

=== 7th to 8th playoff ===
==== Antigua and Barbuda vs. Panama ====
Antigua and Barbuda
2
Costa Rica Country Club, Escazú, Costa Rica
22 June
Hard

Panama
1

			1	2	3
1	(Antigua and Barbuda) (Panama)	Shakir Elvin; Marcelo Rodríguez	3; 6	2; 6
2	(Antigua and Barbuda) (Panama)	Jody Maginley; José Gilbert Gómez	6; 3	6; 1
3	(Antigua and Barbuda) (Panama)	Shakir Elvin / Jody Maginley; Luis Gómez / Marcelo Rodríguez	3; 6	6; 3	6; 4

=== 9th to 10th playoff ===
==== U.S. Virgin Islands vs. Bermuda ====
U.S. Virgin Islands
1
Costa Rica Country Club, Escazú, Costa Rica
22 June
Hard

Bermuda
2

			1	2	3
1	(United States Virgin Islands) (Bermuda)	Russell Armstrong; Gavin Manders	0; 5			retired
2	(United States Virgin Islands) (Bermuda)	Tomas del Olmo; Neal Towlson	4; 6	3; 6
3	(United States Virgin Islands) (Bermuda)	Nicholas Bass / Tomas del Olmo; Richard Mallory / Tariq Simons	7^{10} 6^{8}	6; 4
