= 2018 Davis Cup Americas Zone Group III =

International tennis competition

The Americas Zone was the unique zone within Group 3 of the regional Davis Cup competition in 2018. The zone's competition was held in round robin format in Escazú, Costa Rica, from 28 May to 2 June 2018. The two winning nations won promotion to Group II, Americas Zone, for 2019.

== Participating nations ==
- Antigua and Barbuda
- Bahamas
- Bermuda
- Costa Rica
- Cuba
- Honduras
- Jamaica
- Panama
- Paraguay

=== Inactive nations ===
- Aruba
- Eastern Caribbean
- Haiti
- Saint Lucia
- Trinidad and Tobago
- U.S. Virgin Islands

== Draw ==
Date: 28 May–2 June

Location: Costa Rica Country Club, Escazú, Costa Rica (hard)

Format: Round-robin basis. The winner of Pool A will play-off against the runner-up of Pool B and the winner of Pool B will play-off against the runner-up of Pool A to determine which two nations will advance to Americas Zone Group II in 2019.

=== Seeding ===
Pot	Nation	Rank^{1}	Seed
1	Paraguay	81	1
1	Honduras	84	2
2	Costa Rica	94	3
2	Jamaica	95	4
3	Bahamas	99	5
3	Cuba	104	6
4	Panama	110	7
4	Bermuda	113	8
4	Antigua and Barbuda	130	9

- ^{1}Davis Cup Rankings as of 9 April 2018

=== Round Robin ===
==== Pool A ====
		PAR	CRC	CUB	PAN	RR; W–L	Set; W–L	Game; W–L	Standings
1	Paraguay		2–1	3–0	3–0	3–0	16–4 (80%)	111–74 (60%)	1
3	Costa Rica	1–2		3–0	3–0	2–1	15–5 (75%)	108–76 (59%)	2
6	Cuba	0–3	0–3		3–0	1–2	7–13 (35%)	82–102 (45%)	3
7	Panama	0–3	0–3	0–3		0–3	2–18 (10%)	65–116 (36%)	4

==== Pool B ====
		BAH	HON	JAM	ANT	BER	RR; W–L	Set; W–L	Game; W–L	Standings
5	Bahamas		2–1	3–0	3–0	3–0	4–0	22–3 (88%)	142–83 (63%)	1
2	Honduras	1–2		1–2	2–1	3–0	2–2	14–10 (58%)	110–86 (56%)	2
4	Jamaica	0–3	2–1		1–2	3–0	2–2	14–13 (52%)	130–121 (52%)	3
9	Antigua and Barbuda	0–3	1–2	2–1		2–1	2–2	10–16 (38%)	107–127 (46%)	4
8	Bermuda	0–3	0–3	0–3	1–2		0–4	4–22 (15%)	77–149 (34%)	5

Standings are determined by: 1. number of wins; 2. number of matches; 3. in two-team ties, head-to-head records; 4. in three-team ties, (a) percentage of sets won (head-to-head records if two teams remain tied), then (b) percentage of games won (head-to-head records if two teams remain tied), then (c) Davis Cup rankings.

=== Playoffs ===
Placing	A Team	Score	B Team
Promotional	Paraguay	0–2	Honduras
Promotional	Costa Rica	1–2	Bahamas
5th–6th	Cuba	2–0	Jamaica
7th–8th	Panama	2–1	Antigua and Barbuda
9th	—N/a		Bermuda

Bahamas and Honduras were promoted to Group II in 2019.

== Round Robin ==
=== Pool A ===
==== Paraguay vs. Panama ====
Paraguay
3
Costa Rica Country Club, Escazú, Costa Rica
30 May
Hard

Panama
0

			1	2	3
1	(Paraguay) (Panama)	Juan Borba; Marcelo Rodríguez	6; 4	6; 1
2	(Paraguay) (Panama)	Ayed Zatar; Walner Espinoza	6; 2	3; 6	6; 3
3	(Paraguay) (Panama)	Diego Galeano / Ayed Zatar; Jorge Daniel Chévez / Luis Alejandro Espinoza Bares	6; 3	7^{7} 6^{4}

==== Costa Rica vs. Cuba ====
Costa Rica
3
Costa Rica Country Club, Escazú, Costa Rica
30 May
Hard

Cuba
0

			1	2	3
1	(Costa Rica) (Cuba)	Sebastián Quirós; Omar Hernández Moreno	0; 6	6; 2	6; 4
2	(Costa Rica) (Cuba)	Jesse Flores; Osmel Rivera Granja	6; 3	7; 5
3	(Costa Rica) (Cuba)	Pablo Núñez / Julián Saborío; Omar Hernández Moreno / Osmel Rivera Granja	6; 3	7; 5

==== Paraguay vs. Cuba ====
Paraguay
3
Costa Rica Country Club, Escazú, Costa Rica
31 May
Hard

Cuba
0

			1	2	3
1	(Paraguay) (Cuba)	Juan Borba; Omar Hernández Moreno	7^{7} 6^{2}	6; 1
2	(Paraguay) (Cuba)	Ayed Zatar; Osmel Rivera Granja	6; 1	6; 3
3	(Paraguay) (Cuba)	Diego Galeano / Ayed Zatar; Denilson Martínez / Osmel Rivera Granja	6; 1	6; 2

==== Costa Rica vs. Panama ====
Costa Rica
3
Costa Rica Country Club, Escazú, Costa Rica
31 May
Hard

Panama
0

			1	2	3
1	(Costa Rica) (Panama)	Sebastián Quirós; Marcelo Rodríguez	6; 2	6; 2
2	(Costa Rica) (Panama)	Jesse Flores; Walner Espinoza	6; 2	6; 2
3	(Costa Rica) (Panama)	Pablo Núñez / Julián Saborío; Walner Espinoza / Luis Alejandro Espinoza Bares	6; 3	6; 2

==== Paraguay vs. Costa Rica ====
Paraguay
2
Costa Rica Country Club, Escazú, Costa Rica
1 June
Hard

Costa Rica
1

			1	2	3
1	(Paraguay) (Costa Rica)	Diego Galeano; Sebastián Quirós	6; 3	5; 7	7; 5
2	(Paraguay) (Costa Rica)	Ayed Zatar; Jesse Flores	6; 4	6; 4
3	(Paraguay) (Costa Rica)	Juan Borba / Juan Pablo Vallejo Álvarez; Pablo Núñez / Julián Saborío	1; 6	3; 6

==== Cuba vs. Panama ====
Cuba
3
Costa Rica Country Club, Escazú, Costa Rica
1 June
Hard

Panama
0

			1	2	3
1	(Cuba) (Panama)	Omar Hernández Moreno; Marcelo Rodríguez	6; 4	6; 1
2	(Cuba) (Panama)	Osmel Rivera Granja; Walner Espinoza	6; 2	6; 4
3	(Cuba) (Panama)	Denilson Martínez / David Rodríguez; Walner Espinoza / Luis Alejandro Espinoza Bares	7; 5	2; 6	7; 5

=== Pool B ===
==== Honduras vs. Bahamas ====
Honduras
1
Costa Rica Country Club, Escazú, Costa Rica
28 May
Hard

Bahamas
2

			1	2	3
1	(Honduras) (The Bahamas)	Keny Turcios; Philip Wilbert Major	4; 6	2; 6
2	(Honduras) (The Bahamas)	Jaime Bendeck; Baker Newman	2; 6	1; 6
3	(Honduras) (The Bahamas)	Jaime Bendeck / Alejandro Obando; Marvin Rolle / Jody Turnquest	6; 2	6; 2

==== Bermuda vs. Antigua and Barbuda ====
Bermuda
1
Costa Rica Country Club, Escazú, Costa Rica
28 May
Hard

Antigua and Barbuda
2

			1	2	3
1	(Bermuda) (Antigua and Barbuda)	Richard Mallory; Kevin Gardner	7^{7} 6^{5}	6; 2
2	(Bermuda) (Antigua and Barbuda)	David Thomas; Jody Maginley	1; 6	3; 6
3	(Bermuda) (Antigua and Barbuda)	Jenson Bascome / Gavin Manders; Carlton Bedminster / Jody Maginley	7^{7} 6^{2}	4; 6	3; 6

==== Jamaica vs. Bermuda ====
Jamaica
3
Costa Rica Country Club, Escazú, Costa Rica
29 May
Hard

Bermuda
0

			1	2	3
1	(Jamaica) (Bermuda)	Dimitri Bird; Richard Mallory	6; 3	6; 4
2	(Jamaica) (Bermuda)	Rowland Phillips; Gavin Manders	6; 3	6; 4
3	(Jamaica) (Bermuda)	Marcus Malcolm / Rowland Phillips; Jenson Bacsome / David Thomas	6; 1	3; 6	6; 3

==== Bahamas vs. Antigua and Barbuda ====
Bahamas
3
Costa Rica Country Club, Escazú, Costa Rica
29 May
Hard

Antigua and Barbuda
0

			1	2	3
1	(The Bahamas) (Antigua and Barbuda)	Philip Wilbert Major; Shakir Elvin	6; 4	6; 3
2	(The Bahamas) (Antigua and Barbuda)	Baker Newman; Jody Maginley	7; 5	7; 5
3	(The Bahamas) (Antigua and Barbuda)	Philip Wilbert Major / Marvin Rolle; Carlton Bedminster / Kevin Gardner	6; 2	6; 0

==== Honduras vs. Bermuda ====
Honduras
3
Costa Rica Country Club, Escazú, Costa Rica
30 May
Hard

Bermuda
0

			1	2	3
1	(Honduras) (Bermuda)	Keny Turcios; Richard Mallory	6; 1	6; 1
2	(Honduras) (Bermuda)	Jaime Bendeck; David Thomas	6; 2	6; 1
3	(Honduras) (Bermuda)	Jaime Bendeck / Alejandro Obando; Jenson Bacsome / Richard Mallory	6; 1	6; 2

==== Jamaica vs. Antigua and Barbuda ====
Jamaica
1
Costa Rica Country Club, Escazú, Costa Rica
30 May
Hard

Antigua and Barbuda
2

			1	2	3
1	(Jamaica) (Antigua and Barbuda)	Dimitri Bird; Shakir Elvin	6; 1	6; 1
2	(Jamaica) (Antigua and Barbuda)	Rowland Phillips; Jody Maginley	5; 7	2; 6
3	(Jamaica) (Antigua and Barbuda)	Marcus Malcolm / Rowland Phillips; Carlton Bedminster / Jody Maginley	4; 6	6; 2	4; 6

==== Honduras vs. Antigua and Barbuda ====
Honduras
2
Costa Rica Country Club, Escazú, Costa Rica
31 May
Hard

Antigua and Barbuda
1

			1	2	3
1	(Honduras) (Antigua and Barbuda)	Keny Turcios; Shakir Elvin	6; 1	6; 2
2	(Honduras) (Antigua and Barbuda)	Jaime Bendeck; Jody Maginley	0; 6	1; 6
3	(Honduras) (Antigua and Barbuda)	Jaime Bendeck / Alejandro Obando; Carlton Bedminster / Jody Maginley	6; 2	6; 4

==== Jamaica vs. Bahamas ====
Jamaica
0
Costa Rica Country Club, Escazú, Costa Rica
31 May
Hard

Bahamas
3

			1	2	3
1	(Jamaica) (The Bahamas)	Dimitri Bird; Philip Wilbert Major	1; 6	3; 6
2	(Jamaica) (The Bahamas)	Rowland Phillips; Baker Newman	6; 1	5; 7	5; 7
3	(Jamaica) (The Bahamas)	Dimitri Bird / Marcus Malcolm; Marvin Rolle / Jody Turnquest	3; 6	6^{3} 7^{7}

==== Honduras vs. Jamaica ====
Honduras
1
Costa Rica Country Club, Escazú, Costa Rica
1 June
Hard

Jamaica
2

			1	2	3
1	(Honduras) (Jamaica)	Alejandro Obando; Dimitri Bird	6; 2	6; 1
2	(Honduras) (Jamaica)	Jaime Bendeck; Rowland Phillips	2; 6	6^{5} 7^{7}
3	(Honduras) (Jamaica)	Alejandro Obando / Keny Turcios; Dimitri Bird / Rowland Phillips	6^{6} 7^{8}	2; 6

==== Bahamas vs. Bermuda ====
Bahamas
3
Costa Rica Country Club, Escazú, Costa Rica
1 June
Hard

Bermuda
0

			1	2	3
1	(The Bahamas) (Bermuda)	Jody Turnquest; Richard Mallory	6; 2	6; 2
2	(The Bahamas) (Bermuda)	Baker Newman; David Thomas	6; 4	6; 1
3	(The Bahamas) (Bermuda)	Philip Wilbert Major / Marvin Rolle; Jenson Bacsome / Richard Mallory	6; 1	6; 4

== Playoffs ==
=== Promotional Playoffs ===
==== Paraguay vs. Honduras ====
Paraguay
0
Costa Rica Country Club, Escazú, Costa Rica
2 June
Hard

Honduras
2

			1	2	3
1	(Paraguay) (Honduras)	Juan Borba; Alejandro Obando	2; 6	6^{3} 7^{7}
2	(Paraguay) (Honduras)	Ayed Zatar; Jaime Bendeck	4; 6	3; 6
3	(Paraguay) (Honduras)	Diego Galeano / Ayed Zatar; Jaime Bendeck / Keny Turcios				not played

==== Bahamas vs. Costa Rica ====
Bahamas
2
Costa Rica Country Club, Escazú, Costa Rica
2 June
Hard

Costa Rica
1

			1	2	3
1	(The Bahamas) (Costa Rica)	Philip Wilbert Major; Sebastián Quirós	6; 2	6; 2
2	(The Bahamas) (Costa Rica)	Baker Newman; Jesse Flores	6^{3} 7^{7}	4; 6
3	(The Bahamas) (Costa Rica)	Philip Wilbert Major / Marvin Rolle; Jesse Flores / Julián Saborío	4; 6	6; 4	6; 3

=== 5th to 6th Playoff ===
==== Cuba vs. Jamaica ====
Cuba
2
Costa Rica Country Club, Escazú, Costa Rica
2 June
Hard

Jamaica
0

			1	2	3
1	(Cuba) (Jamaica)	Omar Hernández Moreno; Marcus Malcolm	7; 5	6; 4
2	(Cuba) (Jamaica)	Osmel Rivera Granja; Rowland Phillips	6; 4	3; 6	7; 5
3	(Cuba) (Jamaica)	Omar Hernández Moreno / Osmel Rivera Granja; Dimitri Bird / Rowland Phillips				not played

=== 7th to 8th Playoff ===
==== Panama vs. Antigua and Barbuda ====
Panama
2
Costa Rica Country Club, Escazú, Costa Rica
2 June
Hard

Antigua and Barbuda
1

			1	2	3
1	(Panama) (Antigua and Barbuda)	Walner Espinoza; Carlton Bedminster	6; 3	6; 2
2	(Panama) (Antigua and Barbuda)	Jorge Daniel Chévez; Jody Maginley	3; 6	4; 6
3	(Panama) (Antigua and Barbuda)	Walner Espinoza / Marcelo Rodríguez; Shakir Elvin / Jody Maginley	4; 6	6; 4	6; 3
