= 2000 Davis Cup Americas Zone Group IV =

International tennis competition

The Americas Zone was one of the three zones of the regional Davis Cup competition in 2000.

In the Americas Zone there were four different tiers, called groups, in which teams competed against each other to advance to the upper tier. The top two teams in Group IV advanced to the Americas Zone Group III in 2001. All other teams remained in Group IV.

== Participating nations ==
- Antigua and Barbuda
- Barbados
- Bermuda
- Eastern Caribbean
- Honduras
- Saint Lucia
- U.S. Virgin Islands

=== Draw ===
- Venue: Club Hondureno Arabe, San Pedro Sula, Honduras
- Date: 13–19 March

	HON	BER	LCA	ATG	BAR	ISV	ECA	RR; W–L	Match; W–L	Set; W–L	Standings
Honduras		3–0	3–0	3–0	3–0	3–0	3–0	6–0	18–0 (100%)	35–5 (88%)	1
Bermuda	0–3		2–1	3–0	2–1	2–1	3–0	5–1	12–6 (67%)	25–15 (63%)	2
Saint Lucia	0–3	1–2		2–1	2–1	3–0	3–0	4–2	11–7 (61%)	23–14 (62%)	3
Antigua and Barbuda	0–3	0–3	1–2		3–0	1–2	3–0	2–4	8–10 (44%)	17–24 (41%)	4
Barbados	0–3	1–2	1–2	0–3		2–1	2–1	2–4	6–12 (33%)	17–28 (38%)	5
U.S. Virgin Islands	0–3	1–2	0–3	2–1	1–2		1–2	1–5	5–13 (28%)	18–28 (39%)	6
Eastern Caribbean	0–3	0–3	0–3	0–3	1–2	2–1		1–5	3–15 (17%)	10–31 (24%)	7

- Honduras and Bermuda promoted to Group III in 2001.

== Results ==
=== Barbados vs. U.S. Virgin Islands ===
Barbados
2
Club Hondureno Arabe, San Pedro Sula, Honduras
13 March 2000

U.S. Virgin Islands
1

			1	2	3
1	(Barbados) (United States Virgin Islands)	Duane Williams; Lenin Mongerie	1; 6	6; 3	7; 9
2	(Barbados) (United States Virgin Islands)	Kodi Lewis; Gregory Newton	7; 5	6; 3
3	(Barbados) (United States Virgin Islands)	James Betts / Kodi Lewis; Lenin Mongerie / Gregory Newton	0; 6	6; 4	7; 5

=== Bermuda vs. Saint Lucia ===
Bermuda
2
Club Hondureno Arabe, San Pedro Sula, Honduras
13 March 2000

Saint Lucia
1

			1	2	3
1	(Bermuda) (Saint Lucia)	Jenson Bascome; McCollin Fontenelle	7; 5	6; 3
2	(Bermuda) (Saint Lucia)	James Collieson; Kane Easter	3; 6	3; 6
3	(Bermuda) (Saint Lucia)	Jenson Bascome / Richard Mallory; Sirsean Arlain / Kane Easter	6; 4	6; 4

=== Eastern Caribbean vs. Honduras ===
Eastern Caribbean
0
Club Hondureno Arabe, San Pedro Sula, Honduras
13 March 2000

Honduras
3

			1	2	3
1	(Eastern Caribbean) (Honduras)	Dexter Christian; Calton Álvarez	0; 6	1; 6
2	(Eastern Caribbean) (Honduras)	Kirt Cable; Carlos Cáceres	3; 6	1; 6
3	(Eastern Caribbean) (Honduras)	Hayden Ashton / Kirt Cable; Francklin García / Christian Kawas	1; 6	6; 4	3; 6

=== Antigua and Barbuda vs. U.S. Virgin Islands ===
Antigua and Barbuda
1
Club Hondureno Arabe, San Pedro Sula, Honduras
14 March 2000

U.S. Virgin Islands
2

			1	2	3
1	(Antigua and Barbuda) (United States Virgin Islands)	Carlton Bedminster; Lenin Mongerie	6; 3	4; 6	6; 4
2	(Antigua and Barbuda) (United States Virgin Islands)	Jerry Williams; Gregory Newton	3; 6	2; 6
3	(Antigua and Barbuda) (United States Virgin Islands)	Carlton Bedminster / Kevin Gardner; Gregory Newton / John Richards	1; 6	1; 6

=== Barbados vs. Eastern Caribbean ===
Barbados
2
Club Hondureno Arabe, San Pedro Sula, Honduras
14 March 2000

Eastern Caribbean
1

			1	2	3
1	(Barbados) (Eastern Caribbean)	Duane Williams; Dexter Christian	7^{7} 6^{4}	1; 6	6; 4
2	(Barbados) (Eastern Caribbean)	Kodi Lewis; Kirt Cable	6; 1	6; 4
3	(Barbados) (Eastern Caribbean)	James Betts / Michael Date; Hayden Ashton / Kirt Cable	4; 6	2; 6

=== Bermuda vs. Honduras ===
Bermuda
0
Club Hondureno Arabe, San Pedro Sula, Honduras
14 March 2000

Honduras
3

			1	2	3
1	(Bermuda) (Honduras)	Richard Mallory; Calton Álvarez	5; 7	1; 3		retired
2	(Bermuda) (Honduras)	James Collieson; Carlos Cáceres	0; 6	4; 6
3	(Bermuda) (Honduras)	Jenson Bascome / Dean Mello; Carlos Cáceres / Christian Kawas	2; 6	1; 6

=== Antigua and Barbuda vs. Saint Lucia ===
Antigua and Barbuda
1
Club Hondureno Arabe, San Pedro Sula, Honduras
15 March 2000

Saint Lucia
2

			1	2	3
1	(Antigua and Barbuda) (Saint Lucia)	Carlton Bedminster; McCollin Fontenelle	6; 2	6; 1
2	(Antigua and Barbuda) (Saint Lucia)	Jerry Williams; Kane Easter	4; 6	2; 6
3	(Antigua and Barbuda) (Saint Lucia)	Carlton Bedminster / Kevin Gardner; Sirsean Arlain / Kane Easter	6^{7} 7^{9}	5; 7

=== Barbados vs. Bermuda ===
Barbados
1
Club Hondureno Arabe, San Pedro Sula, Honduras
15 March 2000

Bermuda
2

			1	2	3
1	(Barbados) (Bermuda)	Duane Williams; Richard Mallory	1; 6	2; 6
2	(Barbados) (Bermuda)	Kodi Lewis; James Collieson	4; 6	6; 3	4; 6
3	(Barbados) (Bermuda)	James Betts / Duane Williams; Jenson Bascome / Dean Mello	7; 5	2; 6	7; 5

=== Eastern Caribbean vs. U.S. Virgin Islands ===
Eastern Caribbean
2
Club Hondureno Arabe, San Pedro Sula, Honduras
15 March 2000

U.S. Virgin Islands
1

			1	2	3
1	(Eastern Caribbean) (United States Virgin Islands)	Dexter Christian; Louis Taylor III	4; 6	2; 6
2	(Eastern Caribbean) (United States Virgin Islands)	Kirt Cable; Lenin Mongerie	1; 6	6; 1	6; 3
3	(Eastern Caribbean) (United States Virgin Islands)	Hayden Ashton / Kirt Cable; Gregory Newton / John Richards	4; 6	6; 3	7; 5

=== Antigua and Barbuda vs. Eastern Caribbean ===
Antigua and Barbuda
3
Club Hondureno Arabe, San Pedro Sula, Honduras
16 March 2000

Eastern Caribbean
0

			1	2	3
1	(Antigua and Barbuda) (Eastern Caribbean)	Kevin Gardner; Dexter Christian	6; 4	6; 3
2	(Antigua and Barbuda) (Eastern Caribbean)	Carlton Bedminster; Kirt Cable	3; 6	7^{7} 6^{3}	6; 2
3	(Antigua and Barbuda) (Eastern Caribbean)	Gershum Philip / Jerry Williams; Hayden Ashton / Damian Hughes	6; 0	1; 6	6; 3

=== Bermuda vs. U.S. Virgin Islands ===
Bermuda
2
Club Hondureno Arabe, San Pedro Sula, Honduras
16 March 2000

U.S. Virgin Islands
1

			1	2	3
1	(Bermuda) (United States Virgin Islands)	Richard Mallory; Louis Taylor III	6; 4	3; 6	6; 8
2	(Bermuda) (United States Virgin Islands)	James Collieson; Gregory Newton	4; 6	6; 2	6; 4
3	(Bermuda) (United States Virgin Islands)	Jenson Bascome / Dean Mello; Gregory Newton / John Richards	4; 6	6; 4	6; 4

=== Honduras vs. Saint Lucia ===
Honduras
3
Club Hondureno Arabe, San Pedro Sula, Honduras
16 March 2000

Saint Lucia
0

			1	2	3
1	(Honduras) (Saint Lucia)	Calton Álvarez; Sirsean Arlain	6; 1	6; 1
2	(Honduras) (Saint Lucia)	Carlos Cáceres; Kane Easter	6; 2	7^{7} 6^{5}
3	(Honduras) (Saint Lucia)	Carlos Cáceres / Christian Kawas; Sirsean Arlain / Jonathan Jean-Baptiste	6; 3	6; 2

=== Antigua and Barbuda vs. Honduras ===
Antigua and Barbuda
0
Club Hondureno Arabe, San Pedro Sula, Honduras
17 March 2000

Honduras
3

			1	2	3
1	(Antigua and Barbuda) (Honduras)	Kevin Gardner; Calton Álvarez	1; 6	1; 6
2	(Antigua and Barbuda) (Honduras)	Carlton Bedminster; Carlos Cáceres	3; 6	0; 6
3	(Antigua and Barbuda) (Honduras)	Gershum Philip / Jerry Williams; Carlos Cáceres / Christian Kawas	2; 6	1; 6

=== Barbados vs. Saint Lucia ===
Barbados
1
Club Hondureno Arabe, San Pedro Sula, Honduras
17 March 2000

Saint Lucia
2

			1	2	3
1	(Barbados) (Saint Lucia)	James Betts; Sirsean Arlain	4; 6	0; 6
2	(Barbados) (Saint Lucia)	Kodi Lewis; Kane Easter	2; 6	2; 6
3	(Barbados) (Saint Lucia)	James Betts / Kodi Lewis; Sirsean Arlain / Jonathan Jean-Baptiste	6^{7} 7^{9}	6; 2	7; 5

=== Bermuda vs. Eastern Caribbean ===
Bermuda
3
Club Hondureno Arabe, San Pedro Sula, Honduras
17 March 2000

Eastern Caribbean
0

			1	2	3
1	(Bermuda) (Eastern Caribbean)	Jenson Bascome; Damian Hughes	6; 4	6; 1
2	(Bermuda) (Eastern Caribbean)	James Collieson; Kirt Cable	6; 2	7; 5
3	(Bermuda) (Eastern Caribbean)	Jenson Bascome / Dean Mello; Hayden Ashton / Damian Hughes	6; 1			retired

=== Antigua and Barbuda v Bermuda ===
Antigua and Barbuda
0
Club Hondureno Arabe, San Pedro Sula, Honduras
18 March 2000

Bermuda
3

			1	2	3
1	(Antigua and Barbuda) (Bermuda)	Gershum Philip; Richard Mallory	1; 6	1; 6
2	(Antigua and Barbuda) (Bermuda)	Carlton Bedminster; James Collieson	1; 6	5; 7
3	(Antigua and Barbuda) (Bermuda)	Kevin Gardner / Jerry Williams; Jenson Bascome / Dean Mello	7^{7} 6^{2}	6^{3} 7^{7}	3; 6

=== Barbados vs. Honduras ===
Barbados
0
Club Hondureno Arabe, San Pedro Sula, Honduras
18 March 2000

Honduras
3

			1	2	3
1	(Barbados) (Honduras)	Duane Williams; Calton Álvarez	1; 6	3; 6
2	(Barbados) (Honduras)	Kodi Lewis; Carlos Cáceres	1; 6	6; 3	1; 6
3	(Barbados) (Honduras)	James Betts / Duane Williams; Carlos Cáceres / Christian Kawas	2; 6	6; 3	3; 6

=== Saint Lucia vs. U.S. Virgin Islands ===
Saint Lucia
3
Club Hondureno Arabe, San Pedro Sula, Honduras
18 March 2000

U.S. Virgin Islands
0

			1	2	3
1	(Saint Lucia) (United States Virgin Islands)	Sirsean Arlain; Louis Taylor III	6; 3	7^{7} 6^{5}
2	(Saint Lucia) (United States Virgin Islands)	Kane Easter; Lenin Mongerie	6; 2	6; 1
3	(Saint Lucia) (United States Virgin Islands)	Sirsean Arlain / Jonathan Jean-Baptiste; Lenin Mongerie / Gregory Newton	7^{7} 6^{3}	7^{7} 6^{3}

=== Antigua and Barbuda vs. Barbados ===
Antigua and Barbuda
3
Club Hondureno Arabe, San Pedro Sula, Honduras
19 March 2000

Barbados
0

			1	2	3
1	(Antigua and Barbuda) (Barbados)	Kevin Gardner; Michael Date	7^{7} 6^{4}	6; 0
2	(Antigua and Barbuda) (Barbados)	Carlton Bedminster; Duane Williams	7; 5	6; 2
3	(Antigua and Barbuda) (Barbados)	Kevin Gardner / Jerry Williams; James Betts / Kodi Lewis	3; 6	7^{7} 6^{5}	6; 2

=== Eastern Caribbean vs. Saint Lucia ===
Eastern Caribbean
0
Club Hondureno Arabe, San Pedro Sula, Honduras
19 March 2000

Saint Lucia
3

			1	2	3
1	(Eastern Caribbean) (Saint Lucia)	Dexter Christian; Sirsean Arlain	2; 6	2; 6
2	(Eastern Caribbean) (Saint Lucia)	Kirt Cable; Kane Easter	4; 6	2; 6
3	(Eastern Caribbean) (Saint Lucia)	Hayden Ashton / Kirt Cable; Sirsean Arlain / Kane Easter	4; 6	2; 6

=== Honduras vs. U.S. Virgin Islands ===
Honduras
3
Club Hondureno Arabe, San Pedro Sula, Honduras
19 March 2000

U.S. Virgin Islands
0

			1	2	3
1	(Honduras) (United States Virgin Islands)	Francklin García; John Richards	7; 5	6; 4
2	(Honduras) (United States Virgin Islands)	Christian Kawas; Gregory Newton	3; 6	6; 1	6; 2
3	(Honduras) (United States Virgin Islands)	Carlos Cáceres / Christian Kawas; Gregory Newton / John Richards	6; 4	5; 7	7; 5
