= 2017 Davis Cup Americas Zone Group III =

International tennis competition

The Americas Zone was one of the three zones of the regional Davis Cup competition in 2017.

In the Americas Zone there were three different tiers, called groups, in which teams competed against each other to advance to the upper tier. Winners in Group III advanced to the Americas Zone Group II in 2018. All other teams remained in Group III.

== Participating nations ==
- Antigua and Barbuda
- Bermuda
- Costa Rica
- Cuba
- Honduras
- Jamaica
- Panama
- Puerto Rico
- Uruguay

=== Inactive nations ===
These nations decided not to compete in the 2017 Davis Cup.

- Aruba
- Eastern Caribbean
- Haiti
- Saint Lucia
- Trinidad and Tobago
- U.S. Virgin Islands

== Draw ==
Date: 12–17 June 2017

Location: Carrasco Lawn Tennis Club, Montevideo, Uruguay (clay)

Format: Round-robin basis. Two pools of four and five teams, respectively (Pools A and B). The winner of each pool plays off against the runner-up of the other pool to determine which two nations are promoted to Americas Zone Group II in 2018.

Seeding: The seeding was based on the Davis Cup Rankings of 10 April 2017 (shown in parentheses below).

Pot 1	Pot 2	Pot 3	Pot 4
1. Uruguay (53); 2. Puerto Rico (79)	3. Costa Rica (84); 4. Honduras (86)	5. Cuba (91); 6. Jamaica (94)	7. Bermuda (107); 8. Panama (115); 9. Antigua and Barbuda (-)

=== Pool A ===
		URU	CRC	PAN	CUB	RR; W–L	Set; W–L	Game; W–L	Standings
53	Uruguay		3–0	3–0	3–0	3–0	18–0 (100%)	111–40 (74%)	1
84	Costa Rica	0–3		3–0	2–1	2–1	11–11 (50%)	99–106 (48%)	2
115	Panama	0–3	0–3		2–1	1–2	6–14 (30%)	74–107 (41%)	3
91	Cuba	0–3	1–2	1–2		0–3	5–15 (25%)	75–106 (41%)	4

=== Pool B ===
		PUR	HON	JAM	BER	ANT	RR; W–L	Set; W–L	Game; W–L	Standings
79	Puerto Rico		3–0	3–0	3–0	3–0	4–0	24–3 (89%)	162–89 (65%)	1
86	Honduras	0–3		2–1	2–1	3–0	3–1	15–11 (58%)	128–107 (54%)	2
94	Jamaica	0–3	1–2		3–0	2–1	2–2	16–12 (57%)	148–122 (55%)	3
107	Bermuda	0–3	1–2	0–3		2–1	1–3	6–18 (25%)	79–126 (39%)	4
NR	Antigua and Barbuda	0–3	0–3	1–2	1–2		0–4	4–21 (16%)	68–141 (33%)	5

Standings are determined by: 1. number of wins; 2) If two teams have the same number of wins, head-to-head record; 3) If three teams have the same number of wins, (a) number of matches won in the group, then (b) percentage of sets won in the group, then (c) percentage of games won in the group, then (d) Davis Cup rankings.

=== Playoffs ===
Placing	A Team	Score	B Team
Promotional	Uruguay	2–0	Honduras
Promotional	Costa Rica	1–2	Puerto Rico
5th–6th	Panama	2–1	Jamaica
7th–8th	Cuba	2–0	Bermuda
9th	—N/a		Antigua and Barbuda

Uruguay and Puerto Rico promoted to Group II in 2018.

== Round robin ==
=== Group A ===
==== Uruguay vs. Cuba ====
Uruguay
3
Carrasco Lawn Tennis Club, Montevideo, Uruguay
14 June 2017
Clay

Cuba
0

			1	2	3
1	(Uruguay) (Cuba)	Marcel Felder; Osmel Rivera Granja	6; 3	6; 1
2	(Uruguay) (Cuba)	Martín Cuevas; Omar Hernández Moreno	6; 1	6; 1
3	(Uruguay) (Cuba)	Martín Cuevas / Santiago Maresca; Denilson Martínez / Osmel Rivera Granja	7^{7} 6^{3}	7; 5

==== Costa Rica vs. Panama ====
Costa Rica
3
Carrasco Lawn Tennis Club, Montevideo, Uruguay
14 June 2017
Clay

Panama
0

			1	2	3
1	(Costa Rica) (Panama)	Ignaci Roca; Marcelo Rodríguez	4; 6	6; 4	7; 5
2	(Costa Rica) (Panama)	Pablo Núñez; Walner Espinoza	4; 6	6; 4	6; 2
3	(Costa Rica) (Panama)	Diego Chavarría / Julián Saborío; José Gilbert Gómez / Luis Gómez	7; 5	6; 4

==== Uruguay vs. Panama ====
Uruguay
3
Carrasco Lawn Tennis Club, Montevideo, Uruguay
15 June 2017
Clay

Panama
0

			1	2	3
1	(Uruguay) (Panama)	Marcel Felder; Walner Espinoza	6; 3	6; 0
2	(Uruguay) (Panama)	Martín Cuevas; José Gilbert Gómez	6; 0	6; 0
3	(Uruguay) (Panama)	Santiago Maresca / Nicolás Xiviller; José Gilbert Gómez / Luis Gómez	6; 3	6; 1

==== Costa Rica vs. Cuba ====
Costa Rica
2
Carrasco Lawn Tennis Club, Montevideo, Uruguay
15 June 2017
Clay

Cuba
1

			1	2	3
1	(Costa Rica) (Cuba)	Ignaci Roca; Osmel Rivera Granja	6; 4	2; 6	4; 6
2	(Costa Rica) (Cuba)	Pablo Núñez; Omar Hernández Moreno	7^{7} 6^{5}	6; 4
3	(Costa Rica) (Cuba)	Pablo Núñez / Julián Saborío; Denilson Martínez / Osmel Rivera Granja	0; 6	6; 1	6; 0

==== Uruguay vs. Costa Rica ====
Uruguay
3
Carrasco Lawn Tennis Club, Montevideo, Cuba
16 June 2017
Clay

Costa Rica
0

			1	2	3
1	(Uruguay) (Costa Rica)	Santiago Maresca; Ignaci Roca	6; 2	6; 2
2	(Uruguay) (Costa Rica)	Martín Cuevas; Julián Saborío	6; 1	6; 2
3	(Uruguay) (Costa Rica)	Santiago Maresca / Nicolás Xiviller; Pablo Núñez / Julián Saborío	6; 3	7^{8} 6^{6}

==== Cuba vs. Panama ====
Cuba
1
Carrasco Lawn Tennis Club, Montevideo, Cuba
16 June 2017
Clay

Panama
2

			1	2	3
1	(Cuba) (Panama)	Osmel Rivera Granja; Marcelo Rodríguez	6; 3	6; 3
2	(Cuba) (Panama)	Omar Hernández Moreno; Walner Espinoza	2; 6	3; 6
3	(Cuba) (Panama)	Denilson Martínez / Osmel Rivera Granja; Walner Espinoza / Luis Gómez	5; 7	3; 6

=== Group B ===
==== Honduras vs. Antigua and Barbuda ====
Honduras
3
Carrasco Lawn Tennis Club, Montevideo, Cuba
12 June 2017
Clay

Antigua and Barbuda
0

			1	2	3
1	(Honduras) (Antigua and Barbuda)	Keny Turcios; Carlton Bedminster	6; 2	6; 1
2	(Honduras) (Antigua and Barbuda)	Jaime Bendeck; Jody Maginley	6; 1	6; 1
3	(Honduras) (Antigua and Barbuda)	Jaime Bendeck / Keny Turcios; Carlton Bedminster / Jody Maginley	6; 1	6; 2

==== Jamaica vs. Bermuda ====
Jamaica
3
Carrasco Lawn Tennis Club, Montevideo, Cuba
12 June 2017
Clay

Bermuda
0

			1	2	3
1	(Jamaica) (Bermuda)	Jacob Bicknell; Gavin Manders	6; 3	7; 5
2	(Jamaica) (Bermuda)	Rowland Phillips; David Thomas	6; 0	6; 1
3	(Jamaica) (Bermuda)	Jacob Bicknell / Rowland Phillips; Jenson Bascome / Jovan Whitter	6; 4	6; 2

==== Puerto Rico vs. Jamaica ====
Puerto Rico
3
Carrasco Lawn Tennis Club, Montevideo, Cuba
13 June 2017
Clay

Jamaica
0

			1	2	3
1	(Puerto Rico) (Jamaica)	Sebastián Arcila; Jacob Bicknell	7; 5	6; 4
2	(Puerto Rico) (Jamaica)	Álex Díaz; Rowland Phillips	7^{7} 6^{1}	1; 6	6; 4
3	(Puerto Rico) (Jamaica)	Álex Díaz / Alex Llompart; Jack Bicknell / Rowland Phillips	5; 7	6; 2	6; 4

==== Bermuda vs. Antigua and Barbuda ====
Bermuda
2
Carrasco Lawn Tennis Club, Montevideo, Cuba
13 June 2017
Clay

Antigua and Barbuda
1

			1	2	3
1	(Bermuda) (Antigua and Barbuda)	Gavin Manders; Cordell Williams	6; 2	6; 1
2	(Bermuda) (Antigua and Barbuda)	David Thomas; Jody Maginley	1; 6	1; 6
3	(Bermuda) (Antigua and Barbuda)	Jenson Bascome / Gavin Manders; Carlton Bedminster / Jody Maginley	6; 4	6; 1

==== Puerto Rico vs. Antigua and Barbuda ====
Puerto Rico
3
Carrasco Lawn Tennis Club, Montevideo, Cuba
14 June 2017
Clay

Antigua and Barbuda
0

			1	2	3
1	(Puerto Rico) (Antigua and Barbuda)	Ignacio García; Cordell Williams	6; 0	6; 0
2	(Puerto Rico) (Antigua and Barbuda)	Álex Díaz; Jody Maginley	6; 4	6; 3
3	(Puerto Rico) (Antigua and Barbuda)	Ignacio García / Alex Llompart; Carlton Bedminster / Jody Maginley	7; 5	0; 0		retired

==== Honduras vs. Bermuda ====
Honduras
2
Carrasco Lawn Tennis Club, Montevideo, Cuba
14 June 2017
Clay

Bermuda
1

			1	2	3
1	(Honduras) (Bermuda)	Alejandro Obando; Gavin Manders	6; 3	6; 2
2	(Honduras) (Bermuda)	Keny Turcios; Jovan Whitter	6; 3	6; 3
3	(Honduras) (Bermuda)	Ricardo Pineda / Keny Turcios; Jenson Bascome / David Thomas	5; 7	3; 6

==== Puerto Rico vs. Bermuda ====
Puerto Rico
3
Carrasco Lawn Tennis Club, Montevideo, Cuba
15 June 2017
Clay

Bermuda
0

			1	2	3
1	(Puerto Rico) (Bermuda)	Ignacio García; Gavin Manders	6; 0	6; 3
2	(Puerto Rico) (Bermuda)	Sebastián Arcila; David Thomas	6; 2	6; 1
3	(Puerto Rico) (Bermuda)	Ignacio García / Alex Llompart; Jenson Bascome / Jovan Whitter	6; 3	7; 5

==== Honduras vs. Jamaica ====
Honduras
2
Carrasco Lawn Tennis Club, Montevideo, Cuba
15 June 2017
Clay

Jamaica
1

			1	2	3
1	(Honduras) (Jamaica)	Alejandro Obando; Jacob Bicknell	5; 7	6; 1	6; 4
2	(Honduras) (Jamaica)	Keny Turcios; Rowland Phillips	4; 6	2; 6
3	(Honduras) (Jamaica)	Jaime Bendeck / Keny Turcios; Jacob Bicknell / Rowland Phillips	6; 3	6; 4

==== Puerto Rico vs. Honduras ====
Puerto Rico
3
Carrasco Lawn Tennis Club, Montevideo, Cuba
16 June 2017
Clay

Honduras
0

			1	2	3
1	(Puerto Rico) (Honduras)	Ignacio García; Ricardo Pineda	6; 1	6; 0
2	(Puerto Rico) (Honduras)	Álex Díaz; Alejandro Obando	6; 2	6^{4} 7^{7}	6; 4
3	(Puerto Rico) (Honduras)	Sebastián Arcila / Alex Llompart; Jaime Bendeck / Ricardo Pineda	7^{8} 6^{6}	7; 5

==== Jamaica vs. Antigua and Barbuda ====
Jamaica
2
Carrasco Lawn Tennis Club, Montevideo, Cuba
16 June 2017
Clay

Antigua and Barbuda
1

			1	2	3
1	(Jamaica) (Antigua and Barbuda)	Jacob Bicknell; Cordell Williams	6; 1	6; 0
2	(Jamaica) (Antigua and Barbuda)	Rowland Phillips; Jody Maginley	5; 7	6; 2	5; 7
3	(Jamaica) (Antigua and Barbuda)	Jacob Bicknell / Rowland Phillips; Carlton Bedminster / Jody Maginley	7; 5	7^{7} 6^{2}

== Playoffs ==
=== Promotional playoffs ===
==== Uruguay vs. Honduras ====
Uruguay
2
Carrasco Lawn Tennis Club, Montevideo, Cuba
17 June 2017
Clay

Honduras
0

			1	2	3
1	(Uruguay) (Honduras)	Marcel Felder; Keny Turcios	6; 2	6; 2
2	(Uruguay) (Honduras)	Martín Cuevas; Jaime Bendeck	6; 4	6; 0
3	(Uruguay) (Honduras)	Martín Cuevas / Marcel Felder; Jaime Bendeck / Keny Turcios				not played

==== Puerto Rico vs. Costa Rica ====
Puerto Rico
2
Carrasco Lawn Tennis Club, Montevideo, Cuba
17 June 2017
Clay

Costa Rica
1

			1	2	3
1	(Puerto Rico) (Costa Rica)	Alex Llompart; Ignaci Roca	2; 6	2; 6
2	(Puerto Rico) (Costa Rica)	Álex Díaz; Pablo Núñez	3; 6	6; 3	6; 4
3	(Puerto Rico) (Costa Rica)	Álex Díaz / Alex Llompart; Pablo Núñez / Julián Saborío	7^{9} 6^{7}	6; 4

=== 5th place playoff ===
==== Panama vs. Jamaica ====
Panama
2
Carrasco Lawn Tennis Club, Montevideo, Cuba
17 June 2017
Clay

Jamaica
1

			1	2	3
1	(Panama) (Jamaica)	Marcelo Rodríguez; Dimitri Bird	6; 1	3; 6	6; 2
2	(Panama) (Jamaica)	Walner Espinoza; Rowland Phillips	1; 6	0; 6
3	(Panama) (Jamaica)	Walner Espinoza / Luis Gómez; Dimitri Bird / Rowland Phillips	6; 3	1; 0		retired

=== 7th place playoff ===
==== Cuba vs. Bermuda ====
Cuba
2
Carrasco Lawn Tennis Club, Montevideo, Cuba
17 June 2017
Clay

Bermuda
0

			1	2	3
1	(Cuba) (Bermuda)	Yasier Estrada; Gavin Manders	7; 5	7; 5
2	(Cuba) (Bermuda)	Osmel Rivera Granja; David Thomas	6; 4	6; 4
3	(Cuba) (Bermuda)	Omar Hernández Moreno / Denilson Martínez; Gavin Manders / David Thomas				not played
