= Jody Maginley =

Antiguan and Barbudan tennis player (born 1995)

- Full name: Herbert John Jody Maginley
- Country (sports): Antigua and Barbuda
- Born: 7 June 1995 (age 31) St. John's, Antigua and Barbuda
- Height: 1.96 m (6 ft 5 in)
- Turned pro: 2017
- Plays: Right-handed (two-handed backhand)
- College: Northern Kentucky
- Coach: Chris Begg
- Prize money: $63,524

Singles
- Career record: 0–0 (at ATP Tour level, Grand Slam level, and in Davis Cup)
- Career titles: 0; 0 Challenger, 0 Futures
- Highest ranking: No. 1,021 (21 October 2019)

Doubles
- Career record: 2–1 (at ATP Tour level, Grand Slam level, and in Davis Cup)
- Career titles: 0; 2 Challenger, 7 Futures
- Highest ranking: No. 158 (23 February 2026)
- Current ranking: No. 173 (2 March 2026)

Team competitions
- Davis Cup: 22–17
- Last updated on: 11 March 2026.

Herbert John Jody Maginley (born 7 June 1995) is an Antiguan tennis player. He has a career high ATP doubles ranking of world No. 158 achieved on 23 February 2026 and a career high singles ranking of No. 1,021 achieved on 21 October 2019. Maginley is the only tennis player from his country to have an ATP ranking and is also his nation's record holder for the most Davis Cup wins with 26 (19 in singles and seven in doubles).

== Career ==
He played college tennis at Northern Kentucky University.

Partnering Alfredo Perez, Maginley won his first Challenger doubles title at the 2025 Morelos Open in Mexico, defeating Finn Reynolds and James Watt in the final which went to a deciding champions tiebreak.

== ATP Challenger and ITF Tour finals ==
=== Doubles 27 (13–14) ===
Legend (doubles) ATP Challenger Tour (2–2) ITF Futures Tour (11–12)	Titles by surface Hard (12–12) Clay (1–2)

Result	W–L	Date	Tournament	Tier	Surface	Partner	Opponents	Score
Loss	0–1	Jun 2015	Mexico F8, Manzanillo	Futures	Hard	(United States) John Lamble	(Venezuela) Luis David Martínez (Mexico) Luis Patiño	5–7, 2–6
Loss	0–2	Jul 2017	Canada F3, Kelowna	Futures	Hard	(United Kingdom) Mark Whitehouse	(Canada) Filip Peliwo (United States) Ronnie Schneider	5–7, 4–6
Loss	0–3	Nov 2018	United States F32, Pensacola	Futures	Clay	(Republic of Ireland) Julian Bradley	(Colombia) Felipe Mantilla (Dominican Republic) José Olivares	4–6, 4–6
Loss	0–4	Nov 2018	Panama F4, Panama City	Futures	Clay	(Colombia) Juan Sebastián Gómez	(Switzerland) Adrien Bossel (Switzerland) Mirko Martinez	4–6, 2–6
Win	1–4	Nov 2018	Dominican Republic F1, Santo Domingo	Futures	Hard	(United States) A.J. Catanzariti	(Switzerland) Luca Castelnuovo (France) Baptiste Crepatte	5–7, 6–3, [10–7]
Loss	1–5	Dec 2018	Dominican Republic F2, Santo Domingo	Futures	Hard	(United States) A.J. Catanzariti	(Peru) Arklon Huertas del Pino (Peru) Conner Huertas del Pino	2–6, 3–6
Loss	1–6	May 2019	M15 Mexico, Cancún	World Tennis Tour	Hard	(United States) Evan Zhu	(United States) George Goldhoff (United States) Austin Rapp	3–6, 1–6
Loss	1–7	Jun 2019	M15 Mexico, Cancún	World Tennis Tour	Hard	(The Bahamas) Justin Roberts	(Argentina) Axel Geller (Colombia) Nicolás Mejía	7–6^{(7–5)}, 1–6, [5–10]
Win	2–7	Jul 2019	M15 Mexico, Cancún	World Tennis Tour	Hard	(The Bahamas) Justin Roberts	(United States) Eric Hadigian (United States) Tanner Smith	6–3, 6–2
Loss	2–8	Jun 2022	M15 Santo Domingo, Dominican Republic	World Tennis Tour	Hard	(Dominican Republic) Peter Bertran	(United States) William Bushamuka (China) Hua Runhao	4–6, 4–6
Win	3–8	Oct 2022	M15 Tallahassee, United States	World Tennis Tour	Hard	(Ghana) Abraham Asaba	(Venezuela) Ricardo Rodriguez-Pace (Poland) Mateusz Terczynski	4–6, 6–2, [10–7]
Win	4–8	Jul 2023	M15 Pittsburgh, United States	World Tennis Tour	Clay	(Barbados) Darian King	(United States) Patrick Maloney (United States) Tyler Zink	6–4, 6–4
Win	5–8	Sep 2023	M25 Madrid, Spain	World Tennis Tour	Hard	(Canada) Juan Carlos Aguilar	(Spain) Bruno Pujol Navarro (Spain) Jorge Plans	6–4, 6–3
Win	6–8	Sep 2023	M25 Sharm El Sheikh, Egypt	World Tennis Tour	Hard	(United States) Joshua Sheehy	(United Kingdom) Adam Jones (United Kingdom) David Quayle	6–3, 7–6^{(8–6)}
Loss	6–9	Sep 2023	M15 Sharm El Sheikh, Egypt	World Tennis Tour	Hard	(United States) Joshua Sheehy	(China) Zhao Zhao (China) Zheng Baoluo	4–6, 7–6^{(7–1)}, [7–10]
Loss	6–10	Apr 2024	M15 Monastir, Tunisia	World Tennis Tour	Hard	(United States) Joshua Sheehy	Egor Agafonov; Aliaksandr Liaonenka	1–6, 6–4, [6–10]
Loss	6–11	May 2024	M25 Xalapa, Mexico	World Tennis Tour	Hard	(United States) Evan Zhu	(Mexico) Alan Fernando Rubio Fierros (United States) Noah Schachter	6–7^{(0–7)}, 3–6
Win	7–11	May 2024	M15 Villahermosa, Mexico	World Tennis Tour	Hard	(United States) Noah Schachter	(Mexico) Alex Hernández (Mexico) Rodrigo Pacheco Mendez	6–4, 6–4
Win	8–11	May 2024	M15 Kingston, Jamaica	World Tennis Tour	Hard	(United States) Joshua Sheehy	(Sweden) Leo Borg (India) Aryan Shah	4–6, 7–5, [10–2]
Win	9–11	May 2024	M15 Kingston, Jamaica	World Tennis Tour	Hard	(United States) Joshua Sheehy	(Ghana) Abraham Asaba (United States) Ryan Fishback	6–2, 6–3
Win	10–11	Jul 2024	M25 East Lansing, United States	World Tennis Tour	Hard	(United States) Joshua Sheehy	(United Kingdom) Ben Jones (Portugal) Duarte Vale	7–5, 6–2
Loss	10–12	Oct 2024	M25 Louisville, United States	World Tennis Tour	Hard	(United States) Evan Zhu	(United States) JJ Mercer (United Kingdom) Johannus Monday	5–7, 4–6
Win	11–12	Mar 2025	Cuernavaca, Mexico	Challenger	Hard	(United States) Alfredo Perez	(Australia) Finn Reynolds (Australia) James Watt	7–5, 6–7^{(5–7)}, [10–8]
Loss	11–13	Apr 2025	Abidjan, Ivory Coast	Challenger	Hard	(France) Clément Chidekh	(Australia) Matt Hulme (Netherlands) Thijmen Loof	6–7^{(3–7)}, 4–6
Win	12–13	Jun 2025	M25 Santo Domingo, Dominican Republic	World Tennis Tour	Hard	(United States) Andre Ilagan	(Brazil) Lucas Andrade da Silva (Brazil) Lucca Pignaton	7–5, 6–7^{(4–7)}, [11–9]
Loss	12–14	Nov 2025	Knoxville, United States	Challenger	Hard (i)	(United States) Mitchell Krueger	(Australia) Patrick Harper (United States) Quinn Vandecasteele	7–6^{(8–6)}, 6–7^{(4–7)}, [10–12]
Win	13–14	Feb 2026	Cleveland, United States	Challenger	Hard (i)	(United States) Cannon Kingsley	(United States) George Goldhoff (Australia) Calum Puttergill	6–3, 6–4

== Davis Cup ==
=== Participations: (13–12) ===
Group membership World Group (0–0) WG Play-off (0–0) Group I (0–0) Group II (0–0) Group III (13–12) Group IV (0–0)	Matches by surface Hard (11–6) Clay (2–6) Grass (0–0) Carpet (0–0)	Matches by type Singles (10–4) Doubles (3–8)

- ▲ ▼ indicates the outcome of the Davis Cup match followed by the score, date, place of event, the zonal classification and its phase, and the court surface.

Rubber outcome	No.	Rubber	Match type (partner if any)	Opponent nation	Opponent player(s)	Score
▼0–3; 12 June 2017; Carrasco Lawn Tennis Club, Montevideo, Uruguay; Americas Zone Group III Round robin Pool B; Clay surface
Defeat	1	II	Singles	Honduras	Jaime Bendeck	1–6, 1–6
Defeat	2	III	Doubles (with Carlton Bedminster) (dead rubber)	Honduras	Jaime Bendeck / Keny Turcios	1–6, 2–6
▼1–2; 13 June 2017; Carrasco Lawn Tennis Club, Montevideo, Uruguay; Americas Zone Group III Round robin Pool B; Clay surface
Victory	3	II	Singles	Bermuda	David Thomas	6–1, 6–1
Defeat	4	III	Doubles (with Carlton Bedminster)	Bermuda	Jenson Bascome / Gavin Manders	4–6, 1–6
▼0–3; 14 June 2017; Carrasco Lawn Tennis Club, Montevideo, Uruguay; Americas Zone Group III Round robin Pool B; Clay surface
Defeat	5	II	Singles	Puerto Rico	Alex Diaz	4–6, 3–6
Defeat	6	III	Doubles (with Carlton Bedminster) (dead rubber)	Puerto Rico	Ignacio García / Alex Llompart	5–7 ret.
▼1–2; 16 June 2017; Carrasco Lawn Tennis Club, Montevideo, Uruguay; Americas Zone Group III Round robin Pool B; Clay surface
Victory	7	II	Singles	Jamaica	Rowland Phillips	7–5, 2–6, 7–5
Defeat	8	III	Doubles (with Carlton Bedminster)	Jamaica	Jacob Bicknell / Rowland Phillips	5–7, 6–7^{(2–7)}
▲2–1; 28 May 2018; Costa Rica Country Club, Escazú, Costa Rica; Americas Zone Group III Round robin Pool B; Hard surface
Victory	9	II	Singles	Bermuda	David Thomas	6–1, 6–3
Victory	10	III	Doubles (with Carlton Bedminster)	Bermuda	Jenson Bascome / Gavin Manders	6–7^{(2–7)}, 6–4, 6–3
▼0–3; 29 May 2018; Costa Rica Country Club, Escazú, Costa Rica; Americas Zone Group III Round robin Pool B; Hard surface
Defeat	11	II	Singles	(The Bahamas) Bahamas	Baker Newman	5–7, 5–7
▲2–1; 30 May 2018; Costa Rica Country Club, Escazú, Costa Rica; Americas Zone Group III Round robin Pool B; Hard surface
Victory	12	II	Singles	Jamaica	Rowland Phillips	7–5, 6–2
Victory	13	III	Doubles (with Carlton Bedminster)	Jamaica	Marcus Malcolm / Rowland Phillips	6–4, 2–6, 6–4
▼1–2; 31 May 2018; Costa Rica Country Club, Escazú, Costa Rica; Americas Zone Group III Round robin Pool B; Hard surface
Victory	14	II	Singles	Honduras	Jaime Bendeck	6–0, 6–1
Defeat	15	III	Doubles (with Carlton Bedminster)	Honduras	Jaime Bendeck / Alejandro Obando	2–6, 4–6
▼1–2; 2 June 2018; Costa Rica Country Club, Escazú, Costa Rica; Americas Zone Group III 7th–8th Playoff; Hard surface
Victory	16	II	Singles	Panama	Jorge Daniel Chévez	6–3, 6–4
Defeat	17	III	Doubles (with Shakir Elvin)	Panama	Walner Espinoza / Marcelo Rodriguez	6–4, 4–6, 3–6
▼1–2; 17 June 2019; Costa Rica Country Club, Escazú, Costa Rica; Americas Zone Group III Round robin Pool A; Hard surface
Victory	18	II	Singles	(The Bahamas) Bahamas	Baker Newman	6–1, 6–3
Defeat	19	III	Doubles (with Carlton Bedminster)	(The Bahamas) Bahamas	Philip Wilbert Major / Baker Newman	2–6, 3–6
▼1–2; 18 June 2019; Costa Rica Country Club, Escazú, Costa Rica; Americas Zone Group III Round robin Pool A; Hard surface
Victory	20	II	Singles	Costa Rica	Jesse Flores	4–6, 6–1, 6–4
Defeat	21	III	Doubles (with Carlton Bedminster)	Costa Rica	Jesse Flores / Pablo Núñez	1–6, 4–6
▲3–0; 19 June 2019; Costa Rica Country Club, Escazú, Costa Rica; Americas Zone Group III Round robin Pool A; Hard surface
Victory	22	II	Singles	(United States Virgin Islands) U.S. Virgin Islands	Tomas del Olmo	6–1, 6–4
▼0–3; 20 June 2019; Costa Rica Country Club, Escazú, Costa Rica; Americas Zone Group III Round robin Pool A; Hard surface
Defeat	23	II	Singles	Puerto Rico	Quinton Vega	3–6, 1–6
▲2–1; 22 June 2019; Costa Rica Country Club, Escazú, Costa Rica; Americas Zone Group III 7th–8th Playoff; Hard surface
Victory	24	II	Singles	Panama	José Gilbert Gómez	6–3, 6–1
Victory	25	III	Doubles (with Shakir Elvin)	Panama	Luis Gómez / Marcelo Rodriguez	3–6, 6–3, 6–4
