= Rowland Phillips (tennis) =

Jamaican tennis player (born 1994)

- Country (sports): Jamaica
- Born: 23 January 1994 (age 32)
- Plays: Right-handed (two-handed backhand)
- Prize money: $6,040

Singles
- Career record: 16–9 (at ATP Tour level, Grand Slam level, and in Davis Cup)
- Career titles: 0
- Highest ranking: No. 1269 (19 August 2019)
- Current ranking: No. 1601 (2 November 2020)

Doubles
- Career record: 11–7 (at ATP Tour level, Grand Slam level, and in Davis Cup)
- Career titles: 0
- Highest ranking: No. 1139 (17 February 2020)
- Current ranking: No. 1187 (2 November 2020)
- Last updated on: 2 November 2020.

Rowland Phillips (born 23 January 1994) is a Jamaican tennis player.

Phillips has a career high ATP singles ranking of 1269 achieved on 19 August 2019. He also has a career high ATP doubles ranking of 1139 achieved on 17 February 2020.

Phillips represents Jamaica at the Davis Cup, where he has a W/L record of 27–16.

== Personal life ==
Phillips is a grandson of Rowland Phillips, the former Chief Justice of Jamaica.

== World Tennis Tour and Challenger finals ==
=== Doubles: 1 (0-1) ===
Legend
ATP Challengers (0–0)
ITF World Tennis Tour (0–1)

Titles by surface
Hard (0–1)
Clay (0–0)
Grass (0–0)
Carpet (0–0)

Result	W–L	Date	Tournament	Tier	Surface	Partner	Opponents	Score
Loss	0–1	Aug 2019	M15 Cancún Mexico	World Tennis Tour	Hard	(United States) Mwendwa Mbithi	(Honduras) Jaime Bendeck (United States) George Goldhoff	6–3, 3–6, [9–11]

== Davis Cup ==
=== Participations: (27–16) ===
Group membership World Group (0–0) WG Play-off (0–0) Group I (0–0) Group II (0–2) Group III (27–14) Group IV (0–0)	Matches by surface Hard (12–6) Clay (15–10) Grass (0–0) Carpet (0–0)	Matches by type Singles (16–9) Doubles (11–7)

- ▲ ▼ indicates the outcome of the Davis Cup match followed by the score, date, place of event, the zonal classification and its phase, and the court surface.

Rubber outcome	No.	Rubber	Match type (partner if any)	Opponent nation	Opponent player(s)	Score
▲2–1; 20 July 2015; Cancha Estadio Centro de Alto Rendimiento, Curundú, Panama; Americas Zone Group III Pool B Round robin; Clay surface
Victory	1	I	Singles	Bermuda	Gavin Manders	7–6^{(7–4)}, 6–1
Victory	2	III	Doubles (with Brandon Burke)	Bermuda	Jenson Bascome / Neal Towlson	6–2, 7–5
▼1–2; 21 July 2015; Cancha Estadio Centro de Alto Rendimiento, Curundú, Panama; Americas Zone Group III Pool B Round robin; Clay surface
Victory	3	I	Singles	Guatemala	Wilfredo González	6–2, 7–5
Defeat	4	III	Doubles (with Brandon Burke)	Guatemala	Christopher Díaz Figueroa / Wilfredo González	1–6, 7–6^{(7–4)}, 6–7^{(2–7)}
▲3–0; 23 July 2015; Cancha Estadio Centro de Alto Rendimiento, Curundú, Panama; Americas Zone Group III Pool B Round robin; Clay surface
Victory	5	I	Singles	Trinidad and Tobago	Vaughn Wilson	6–2, 7–5
▲2–1; 24 July 2015; Cancha Estadio Centro de Alto Rendimiento, Curundú, Panama; Americas Zone Group III Pool B Round robin; Clay surface
Victory	6	II	Singles	(The Bahamas) Bahamas	Kevin Major	7–5, 6–0
Victory	7	III	Doubles (with Brandon Burke)	(The Bahamas) Bahamas	Jamaal Adderley / Marvin Rolle	1–6, 7–6^{(8–6)}, 6–4
▼0–2; 25 July 2015; Cancha Estadio Centro de Alto Rendimiento, Curundú, Panama; Americas Zone Group III 1st-4th Play-off; Clay surface
Defeat	8	I	Singles	Paraguay	Ayed Zatar	4–6, 7–6^{(8–6)}, 5–7
▲3–0; 11 July 2016; Club de Tenis La Paz, La Paz, Bolivia; Americas Zone Group III Pool A Round robin; Clay surface
Victory	9	II	Singles	Cuba	William Dorantes Sanchez	6–1, 6–1
Victory	10	III	Doubles (with Dominic Pagon) (dead rubber)	Cuba	Osmel Rivera Granja / Cristian Rodríguez	2–6, 6–3, 6–2
▲3–0; 12 July 2016; Club de Tenis La Paz, La Paz, Bolivia; Americas Zone Group III Pool A Round robin; Clay surface
Victory	11	II	Singles	Panama	Alejandro Javier Arrue Martiz	6–0, 6–0
Victory	12	III	Doubles (with Dominic Pagon) (dead rubber)	Panama	Alejandro Benítez / Brendan Cockburn	6–0, 6–1
▼0–3; 14 July 2016; Club de Tenis La Paz, La Paz, Bolivia; Americas Zone Group III Pool A Round robin; Clay surface
Defeat	13	II	Singles	Bolivia	Hugo Dellien	3–6, 2–6
Defeat	14	III	Doubles (with Dominic Pagon) (dead rubber)	Bolivia	Rodrigo Banzer / Alejandro Mendoza	4–6, 6–7^{(1–7)}
▼0–2; 16 July 2016; Club de Tenis La Paz, La Paz, Bolivia; Americas Zone Group III 1st-4th Play-off; Clay surface
Defeat	15	II	Singles	(The Bahamas) Bahamas	Baker Newman	1–6, 6–4, 5–7
▲3–0; 12 June 2017; Carrasco Lawn Tennis Club, Montevideo, Uruguay; Americas Zone Group III Pool B Round robin; Clay surface
Victory	16	II	Singles	Bermuda	David Thomas	6–0, 6–1
Victory	17	III	Doubles (with Jacob Bicknell) (dead rubber)	Bermuda	Jenson Bascome / Jovan Whitter	6–4, 6–2
▼0–3; 13 June 2017; Carrasco Lawn Tennis Club, Montevideo, Uruguay; Americas Zone Group III Pool B Round robin; Clay surface
Defeat	18	II	Singles	Puerto Rico	Alex Díaz	6–7^{(1–7)}, 6–1, 4–6
Defeat	19	III	Doubles (with Jacob Bicknell) (dead rubber)	Puerto Rico	Alex Díaz / Alex Llompart	7–5, 2–6, 4–6
▼1–2; 15 June 2017; Carrasco Lawn Tennis Club, Montevideo, Uruguay; Americas Zone Group III Pool B Round robin; Clay surface
Victory	20	II	Singles	Honduras	Keny Turcios	6–4, 6–2
Defeat	21	III	Doubles (with Jacob Bicknell)	Honduras	Jaime Bendeck / Keny Turcios	3–6, 4–6
▲2–1; 16 June 2017; Carrasco Lawn Tennis Club, Montevideo, Uruguay; Americas Zone Group III Pool B Round robin; Clay surface
Defeat	22	II	Singles	Antigua and Barbuda	Jody Maginley	5–7, 6–2, 5–7
Victory	23	III	Doubles (with Jacob Bicknell)	Antigua and Barbuda	Carlton Bedminster / Jody Maginley	7–5, 7–6^{(7–2)}
▼1–2; 17 June 2017; Carrasco Lawn Tennis Club, Montevideo, Uruguay; Americas Zone Group III 5th-6th Play-off; Clay surface
Victory	24	II	Singles	Panama	Walner Espinoza	6–1, 6–0
Defeat	25	III	Doubles (with Dimitri Bird)	Panama	Walner Espinoza / Luis Gómez	3–6, 0–1 ret.
▲3–0; 29 May 2018; Costa Rica Country Club, Escazú Centro, Costa Rica; Americas Zone Group III Pool B Round robin; Hard surface
Victory	26	II	Singles	Bermuda	Gavin Manders	6–3, 6–4
Victory	27	III	Doubles (with Marcus Malcolm) (dead rubber)	Bermuda	Jenson Bascome / David Thomas	6–1, 3–6, 6–3
▼1–2; 30 May 2018; Costa Rica Country Club, Escazú Centro, Costa Rica; Americas Zone Group III Pool B Round robin; Hard surface
Defeat	28	II	Singles	Antigua and Barbuda	Jody Maginley	5–7, 2–6
Defeat	29	III	Doubles (with Marcus Malcolm)	Antigua and Barbuda	Carlton Bedminster / Jody Maginley	4–6, 6–2, 4–6
▼0–3; 31 May 2018; Costa Rica Country Club, Escazú Centro, Costa Rica; Americas Zone Group III Pool B Round robin; Hard surface
Defeat	30	II	Singles	(The Bahamas) Bahamas	Baker Newman	6–1, 5–7, 5–7
▲2–1; 1 June 2018; Costa Rica Country Club, Escazú Centro, Costa Rica; Americas Zone Group III Pool B Round robin; Hard surface
Victory	31	II	Singles	Honduras	Jaime Bendeck	6–2, 7–6^{(7–5)}
Victory	32	III	Doubles (with Dimitri Bird)	Honduras	Alejandro Obando / Keny Turcios	7–6^{(8–6)}, 6–2
▼0–2; 2 June 2018; Costa Rica Country Club, Escazú Centro, Costa Rica; Americas Zone Group III 5th-6th Play-off; Hard surface
Defeat	33	II	Singles	Cuba	Osmel Rivera Granja	4–6, 6–3, 5–7
▲2–1; 17 June 2019; Costa Rica Country Club, Escazú Centro, Costa Rica; Americas Zone Group III Pool B Round robin; Hard surface
Victory	34	II	Singles	Panama	José Gilbert Gómez	6–3, 6–2
Victory	35	III	Doubles (with Dominic Pagon)	Panama	Jorge Daniel Chévez / Luis Gómez	6–2, 6–1
▲2–1; 18 June 2019; Costa Rica Country Club, Escazú Centro, Costa Rica; Americas Zone Group III Pool B Round robin; Hard surface
Victory	36	II	Singles	Trinidad and Tobago	Akiel Duke	6–1, 6–1
Victory	37	III	Doubles (with Dominic Pagon)	Trinidad and Tobago	Akiel Duke / Nabeel Majeed Mohammed	6–3, 7–6^{(7–0)}
▲2–1; 19 June 2019; Costa Rica Country Club, Escazú Centro, Costa Rica; Americas Zone Group III Pool B Round robin; Hard surface
Victory	38	II	Singles	Bermuda	Tariq Simons	6–2, 6–2
Victory	39	III	Doubles (with Dominic Pagon)	Bermuda	Gavin Manders / Neal Towlson	6–1, 6–3
▲2–1; 20 June 2019; Costa Rica Country Club, Escazú Centro, Costa Rica; Americas Zone Group III Pool B Round robin; Hard surface
Victory	40	II	Singles	Cuba	Osmel Rivera Granja	6–2, 5–7, 6–4
▲2–1; 21 June 2019; Costa Rica Country Club, Escazú Centro, Costa Rica; Americas Zone Group III Pool B Round robin; Hard surface
Victory	41	II	Singles	Honduras	Jaime Bendeck	6–4, 6–1
▼1–3; 6-7 March 2020; Complejo Polideportivo de Ciudad Merliot, Santa Tecla, El Salvador; World Group II Play-off First round; Hard surface
Defeat	42	II	Singles	El Salvador	Marcelo Arévalo	3–6, 7–6^{(7–4)}, 2–6
Defeat	43	III	Doubles (with Blaise Bicknell)	El Salvador	Marcelo Arévalo / Lluis Miralles	3–6, 2–6
