= Jaime Bendeck =

Honduran tennis player (born 1996)

- Country (sports): United States; Honduras
- Residence: Hollywood, Florida, U.S.
- Born: 21 November 1996 (age 28) Valencia, Spain
- College: Baylor
- Prize money: $4,891

Singles
- Career record: 4–5 (at ATP Tour level, Grand Slam level, and in Davis Cup)
- Career titles: 0 ITF
- Highest ranking: No. 1,580 (30 April 2018)

Doubles
- Career record: 6–1 (at ATP Tour level, Grand Slam level, and in Davis Cup)
- Career titles: 1 ITF
- Highest ranking: No. 571 (10 February 2020)

Team competitions
- Davis Cup: 10–6
- Last updated on: 11 September 2025.

Jaime Bendeck (born 21 November 1996) is a Honduran tennis player.

Bendeck has a career high ATP singles ranking of No. 1580 achieved on 30 April 2018. He also has a career high ATP doubles ranking of No. 571 achieved on 10 February 2020.

Bendeck represents Honduras at the Davis Cup, where he has a W/L record of 10–6.

Bendeck played college tennis at Baylor.

== World Tennis Tour and Challenger finals ==
=== Doubles: 2 (1–1) ===
Legend
ATP Challengers (0–0)
ITF World Tennis Tour (1–1)

Titles by surface
Hard (1–1)
Clay (0–0)
Grass (0–0)
Carpet (0–0)

Result	W–L	Date	Tournament	Tier	Surface	Partner	Opponents	Score
Win	1–0	Aug 2019	M15 Cancún Mexico	World Tennis Tour	Hard	(United States) George Goldhoff	(United States) Mwendwa Mbithi (Jamaica) Rowland Phillips	3–6, 6–3, [11–9]
Loss	1–1	Sep 2019	M25 Harlingen United States	World Tennis Tour	Hard	(Germany) Timo Stodder	(United States) Harrison Adams (United States) George Goldhoff	7–5, 3–6, [1–10]

== Davis Cup ==
=== Participations: (10–6) ===
Group membership World Group (0–0) WG Play-off (0–0) Group I (0–0) Group II (0–0) Group III (10–6) Group IV (0–0)	Matches by surface Hard (7–4) Clay (3–2) Grass (0–0) Carpet (0–0)	Matches by type Singles (4–5) Doubles (6–1)

- ▲ ▼ indicates the outcome of the Davis Cup match followed by the score, date, place of event, the zonal classification and its phase, and the court surface.

Rubber outcome	No.	Rubber	Match type (partner if any)	Opponent nation	Opponent player(s)	Score
▲3–0; 12 June 2017; Carrasco Lawn Tennis Club, Montevideo, Uruguay; Americas Zone Group III Pool B Round robin; Clay surface
Victory	1	I	Singles	Antigua and Barbuda	Jody Maginley	6–1, 6–1
Victory	2	III	Doubles (with Keny Turcios) (dead rubber)	Antigua and Barbuda	Carlton Bedminster / Jody Maginley	6–1, 6–2
▲2–1; 15 June 2017; Carrasco Lawn Tennis Club, Montevideo, Uruguay; Americas Zone Group III Pool B Round robin; Clay surface
Victory	3	III	Doubles (with Keny Turcios)	Jamaica	Jacob Bicknell / Rowland Phillips	6–3, 6–4
▼0–3; 16 June 2017; Carrasco Lawn Tennis Club, Montevideo, Uruguay; Americas Zone Group III Pool B Round robin; Clay surface
Defeat	4	III	Doubles (with Ricardo Pineda) (dead rubber)	Puerto Rico	Sebastián Arcila / Alex Llompart	6–7^{(6–8)}, 5–7
▼0–2; 17 June 2017; Carrasco Lawn Tennis Club, Montevideo, Uruguay; Americas Zone Group III 1st-4th Play-off; Clay surface
Defeat	5	II	Singles	Uruguay	Martín Cuevas	4–6, 0–6
▼1–2; 28 May 2018; Costa Rica Country Club, Escazú, Costa Rica; Americas Zone Group III Pool B Round robin; Hard surface
Defeat	6	II	Singles	(The Bahamas) Bahamas	Baker Newman	2–6, 1–6
Victory	7	III	Doubles (with Alejandro Obando) (dead rubber)	(The Bahamas) Bahamas	Marvin Rolle / Jody Turnquest	6–2, 6–2
▲3–0; 30 May 2018; Costa Rica Country Club, Escazú, Costa Rica; Americas Zone Group III Pool B Round robin; Hard surface
Victory	8	II	Singles	Bermuda	David Thomas	6–2, 6–1
Victory	9	III	Doubles (with Alejandro Obando) (dead rubber)	Bermuda	Jenson Bascome / Richard Mallory	6–1, 6–2
▲2–1; 31 May 2018; Costa Rica Country Club, Escazú, Costa Rica; Americas Zone Group III Pool B Round robin; Hard surface
Defeat	10	II	Singles	Antigua and Barbuda	Jody Maginley	0–6, 1–6
Victory	11	III	Doubles (with Alejandro Obando)	Antigua and Barbuda	Carlton Bedminster / Jody Maginley	6–2, 6–4
▼1–2; 1 June 2018; Costa Rica Country Club, Escazú, Costa Rica; Americas Zone Group III Pool B Round robin; Hard surface
Defeat	12	II	Singles	Jamaica	Rowland Phillips	2–6, 6–7^{(5–7)}
▲2–0; 1 June 2018; Costa Rica Country Club, Escazú, Costa Rica; Americas Zone Group III 1st-4th Play-off; Hard surface
Victory	13	II	Singles	Paraguay	Ayed Zatar	6–4, 6–3
▲2–1; 17 June 2019; Costa Rica Country Club, Escazú, Costa Rica; Americas Zone Group III Pool B Round robin; Hard surface
Victory	14	II	Singles	Bermuda	Neal Towlson	6–3, 6–4
▼1–2; 20 June 2019; Costa Rica Country Club, Escazú, Costa Rica; Americas Zone Group III Pool B Round robin; Hard surface
Victory	15	III	Doubles (with Keny Turcios) (dead rubber)	Panama	Jorge Daniel Chévez / José Gilbert Gómez	7–6^{(7–5)}, 6–1
▼1–2; 21 June 2019; Costa Rica Country Club, Escazú, Costa Rica; Americas Zone Group III Pool B Round robin; Hard surface
Defeat	16	II	Singles	Jamaica	Rowland Phillips	4–6, 1–6
