= 2017 Davis Cup =

2017 edition of the Davis Cup

Details
- Duration: 3 February – 26 November 2017
- Edition: 106th

Champion
- Winning nation: France

The 2017 Davis Cup was the 106th edition of the Davis Cup, a tournament between national teams in men's tennis. It was sponsored by BNP Paribas. France won their tenth title (their first since 2001), with Lucas Pouille defeating Steve Darcis of Belgium on indoor hard in the final match held at Stade Pierre-Mauroy located in Villeneuve-d'Ascq on 26 November.

== World Group ==
Participating teams
Argentina	Australia	Belgium	Canada
Croatia	Czech Republic	France	Germany
Great Britain	Italy	Japan	Russia
Serbia	Spain	Switzerland	United States

=== Seeds ===
1. Argentina (first round)
2. Croatia (first round)
3. Great Britain (quarterfinals)
4. Czech Republic (first round)
5. Switzerland (first round)
6. France (world champion of team)
7. Belgium (final)
8. Serbia (semifinals)

=== Draw ===
First round 3–5 February
Buenos Aires, Argentina (clay)
1	Argentina	2
Italy	3
Frankfurt, Germany (indoor hard)
7	Belgium	4
Germany	1
Kooyong, Australia (hard)
4	Czech Republic	1
Australia	4
Birmingham, United States (indoor hard)
5	Switzerland	0
United States	5
Tokyo, Japan (indoor hard)
Japan	1
6	France	4
Ottawa, Canada (indoor hard)
Canada	2
3	Great Britain	3
Niš, Serbia (indoor hard)
Russia	1
8	Serbia	4
Osijek, Croatia (indoor hard)
Spain	3
2	Croatia	2

Quarterfinals; 7–9 April
Charleroi, Belgium (indoor hard)
Italy	2
7	Belgium	3
Brisbane, Australia (hard)
Australia	3
United States	2
Rouen, France (indoor clay)
6	France	4
3	Great Britain	1
Belgrade, Serbia (indoor hard)
8	Serbia	4
Spain	1

Semifinals; 15–17 September
Brussels, Belgium (indoor clay)
7	Belgium	3
Australia	2
Villeneuve-d'Ascq, France (clay)
6	France	3
8	Serbia	1

Final; 24–26 November
Villeneuve-d'Ascq, France (indoor hard)
7	Belgium	2
6	France	3

=== Final ===
France
3
Stade Pierre-Mauroy, Villeneuve-d'Ascq, France
24–26 November 2017
Hard (i)

Belgium
2

			1	2	3	4	5
1	(France) (Belgium)	Lucas Pouille; David Goffin	5; 7	3; 6	1; 6
2	(France) (Belgium)	Jo-Wilfried Tsonga; Steve Darcis	6; 3	6; 2	6; 1
3	(France) (Belgium)	Richard Gasquet / Pierre-Hugues Herbert; Ruben Bemelmans / Joris De Loore	6; 1	3; 6	7^{7} 6^{2}	6; 4
4	(France) (Belgium)	Jo-Wilfried Tsonga; David Goffin	6^{5} 7^{7}	3; 6	2; 6
5	(France) (Belgium)	Lucas Pouille; Steve Darcis	6; 3	6; 1	6; 0

== World Group play-offs ==
Date: 15–17 September

The eight losing teams in the World Group first round ties and eight winners of the Zonal Group I final round ties competed in the World Group play-offs for spots in the 2018 World Group.

Seeded teams

1. Argentina
2. Croatia
3. Switzerland
4. Czech Republic
5. Germany
6. Japan
7. Russia
8. Canada

Unseeded teams

- Belarus
- Brazil
- Colombia
- Hungary
- India
- Kazakhstan
- Netherlands
- Portugal

Home team	Score	Visiting team	Location	Venue	Door	Surface
Kazakhstan	3–2	Argentina	Astana	National Tennis Center	Indoor	Hard
Colombia	1–4	Croatia	Bogotá	Plaza de Toros La Santamaría	Outdoor	Clay
Switzerland	3–2	Belarus	Biel/Bienne	Swiss Tennis Arena	Indoor	Hard
Netherlands	3–2	Czech Republic	The Hague	Sportcampus Zuiderpark	Indoor	Clay
Portugal	2–3	Germany	Lisbon	Clube de Ténis do Jamor	Outdoor	Clay
Japan	3–1	Brazil	Osaka	Utsubo Tennis Center	Outdoor	Hard
Hungary	3–1	Russia	Budapest	Margaret Island Athletic Centre	Outdoor	Clay
Canada	3–2	India	Edmonton	Northlands Coliseum	Indoor	Hard

- Canada, Croatia, Germany, Japan and Switzerland will remain in the World Group in 2018.
- Hungary, Kazakhstan and Netherlands are promoted to the World Group in 2018.
- Belarus, Brazil, Colombia, India and Portugal will remain in Zonal Group I in 2018.
- Argentina, Czech Republic and Russia are relegated to Zonal Group I in 2018.

== Americas Zone ==
=== Group I ===
Seeds: All seeds received a bye into the second round.

1. Brazil
2. Colombia

Remaining nations:

- Chile
- Dominican Republic
- Ecuador
- Peru

==== Draw ====
Second Round Play-offs
Santo Domingo, Dominican Republic (hard)
Peru	1
Dominican Republic	4

First Round Play-offs
bye
Peru
Dominican Republic
bye

First Round
1	Brazil
bye
Guayaquil, Ecuador (clay)
Peru	0
Ecuador	5
Santo Domingo Este, Dominican Republic (hard)
Dominican Republic	0
Chile	5
bye
2	Colombia

Second Round
Ambato, Ecuador (clay)
1	Brazil	5
Ecuador	0
Medellín, Colombia (clay)
Chile	1
2	Colombia	3

- Peru relegated to Group II in 2018.
- Brazil and Colombia advance to World Group Play-off.

=== Group II ===
Seeds:

1. Barbados
2. Venezuela
3. Mexico
4. El Salvador

Remaining nations:

- Bahamas
- Bolivia
- Guatemala
- Paraguay

==== Draw ====
Play-offs
Zapopan, Mexico (hard)
Paraguay	0
3	Mexico	5
Santa Cruz de la Sierra, Bolivia (clay)
Bolivia	4
Bahamas	1

First Round
Asunción, Paraguay (clay)
1	Barbados	3
Paraguay	2
Guatemala City, Guatemala (hard)
3	Mexico	1
Guatemala	3
San Salvador, El Salvador (hard)
Bolivia	2
4	El Salvador	3
Doral, United States (hard)
Bahamas	0
2	Venezuela	5

Second Round
Saint Michael, Barbados (hard)
1	Barbados	3
Guatemala	2
Doral, United States (hard)
4	El Salvador	2
2	Venezuela	3

Third Round
Wildey, Barbados (hard)
1	Barbados	3
2	Venezuela	2

- Paraguay and Bahamas relegated to Group III in 2018.
- Barbados promoted to Group I in 2018.

=== Group III ===
Date: 12–17 June

Location: Carrasco Lawn Tennis Club, Montevideo, Uruguay (clay)

Format: Round-robin basis. Two pools of four and five teams, respectively (Pools A and B). The winner of each pool plays off against the runner-up of the other pool to determine which two nations are promoted to Americas Zone Group II in 2018.

Participating teams:

- Antigua and Barbuda
- Bermuda
- Costa Rica
- Cuba
- Honduras
- Jamaica
- Panama
- Puerto Rico
- Uruguay

Seeding: The seeding was based on the Davis Cup Rankings of 10 April 2017 (shown in parentheses below).

Pot 1	Pot 2	Pot 3	Pot 4
1. Uruguay (53); 2. Puerto Rico (79)	3. Costa Rica (84); 4. Honduras (86)	5. Cuba (91); 6. Jamaica (94)	7. Bermuda (107); 8. Panama (115); 9. Antigua and Barbuda (-)

==== Pool A ====
		URU	CRC	PAN	CUB	RR; W–L	Set; W–L	Game; W–L	Standings
53	Uruguay		3–0	3–0	3–0	3–0	18–0 (100%)	111–40 (74%)	1
84	Costa Rica	0–3		3–0	2–1	2–1	11–11 (50%)	99–106 (48%)	2
115	Panama	0–3	0–3		2–1	1–2	6–14 (30%)	74–107 (41%)	3
91	Cuba	0–3	1–2	1–2		0–3	5–15 (25%)	75–106 (41%)	4

==== Pool B ====
		PUR	HON	JAM	BER	ANT	RR; W–L	Set; W–L	Game; W–L	Standings
79	Puerto Rico		3–0	3–0	3–0	3–0	4–0	24–3 (89%)	162–89 (65%)	1
86	Honduras	0–3		2–1	2–1	3–0	3–1	15–11 (58%)	128–107 (54%)	2
94	Jamaica	0–3	1–2		3–0	2–1	2–2	16–12 (57%)	148–122 (55%)	3
107	Bermuda	0–3	1–2	0–3		2–1	1–3	6–18 (25%)	79–126 (39%)	4
NR	Antigua and Barbuda	0–3	0–3	1–2	1–2		0–4	4–21 (16%)	68–141 (33%)	5

==== Playoffs ====
Placing	A Team	Score	B Team
Promotional	Uruguay	2–0	Honduras
Promotional	Costa Rica	1–2	Puerto Rico
5th–6th	Panama	2–1	Jamaica
7th–8th	Cuba	2–0	Bermuda
9th	—N/a		Antigua and Barbuda

Uruguay and Puerto Rico promoted to Group II in 2018.

== Asia/Oceania Zone ==
=== Group I ===
Seeds: The first seed received a bye into the second round.

1. Kazakhstan
2. India

Remaining nations:

- China
- Chinese Taipei
- New Zealand
- South Korea
- Uzbekistan

==== Draw ====
Second Round Play-offs
Yanggu, South Korea (hard)
Chinese Taipei	2
South Korea	3

First Round Play-offs
bye
Chinese Taipei
Auckland, New Zealand (hard)
South Korea	2
New Zealand	3

First Round
1	Kazakhstan
bye
Kaohsiung, Taiwan (hard)
Chinese Taipei	0
China	5
Gimcheon, South Korea (indoor hard)
Uzbekistan	3
South Korea	1
Pune, India (hard)
New Zealand	1
2	India	4

Second Round
Astana, Kazakhstan (indoor clay)
1	Kazakhstan	4
China	1
Bangalore, India (hard)
Uzbekistan	1
2	India	4

- Chinese Taipei relegated to Group II in 2018.
- Kazakhstan and India advance to World Group Play-off.

=== Group II ===
Seeds:

1. Pakistan
2. Thailand
3. Philippines
4. Vietnam

Remaining nations:

- Hong Kong
- Indonesia
- Iran
- Kuwait

==== Draw ====
Play-offs
Isfahan, Iran (clay)
Iran	5
Vietnam	0
Surakarta, Indonesia (hard)
Indonesia	4
Kuwait	1

First Round
Islamabad, Pakistan (hard)
1	Pakistan	3
Iran	2
Ho Chi Minh City, Vietnam (hard)
4	Vietnam	2
Hong Kong	3
Manila, Philippines (indoor clay)
Indonesia	1
3	Philippines	4
Mishref, Kuwait (hard)
Kuwait	1
2	Thailand	3

Second Round
Islamabad, Pakistan (grass)
1	Pakistan	w/o
Hong Kong
Nonthaburi, Thailand (hard)
3	Philippines	0
2	Thailand	5

Third Round
Islamabad, Pakistan (grass)
1	Pakistan	3
2	Thailand	2

- Vietnam and Kuwait relegated to Group III in 2018.
- Pakistan promoted to Group I in 2018.

=== Group III ===
Date: 17–22 July

Location: Sri Lanka Tennis Association, Colombo, Sri Lanka (clay)

Participating teams:

- Jordan
- Lebanon
- Malaysia
- Pacific Oceania
- Qatar
- Sri Lanka
- Syria
- Turkmenistan
- United Arab Emirates

Format: Round-robin basis. Two pools of four and five teams, respectively (Pools A and B). The winner of each pool plays off against the runner-up of the other pool to determine which two nations are promoted to Asia/Oceania Zone Group II in 2018.

Seeding: The seeding was based on the Davis Cup Rankings of 10 April 2017 (shown in parentheses below).

Pot 1	Pot 2	Pot 3	Pot 4
1. Sri Lanka (78); 2. Lebanon (88)	3. Malaysia (89); 4. Syria (93)	5. Pacific Oceania (97); 6. Qatar (100)	7. United Arab Emirates (103); 8. Jordan (104); 9. Turkmenistan (105)

==== Pool A ====
		SRI	JOR	POC	SYR	RR; W–L	Set; W–L	Game; W–L	Standings
78	Sri Lanka		2–1	2–1	2–1	3–0	12–6 (67%)	96–66 (59%)	1
104	Jordan	1–2		2–1	2–1	2–1	10–9 (53%)	82–95 (46%)	2
97	Pacific Oceania	1–2	1–2		2–1	1–2	10–11 (48%)	91–91 (50%)	3
93	Syria	1–2	1–2	1–2		0–3	7–13 (35%)	78–95 (45%)	4

==== Pool B ====
		LBN	QAT	MAS	UAE	TKM	RR; W–L	Set; W–L	Game; W–L	Standings
88	Lebanon		3–0	2–1	2–1	2–1	4–0	19–8 (70%)	147–100 (60%)	1
100	Qatar	0–3		2–0	2–1	2–1	3–1	15–12 (56%)	118–111 (52%)	2
89	Malaysia	1–2	0–2		2–1	3–0	2–2	14–11 (56%)	121–100 (55%)	3
103	United Arab Emirates	1–2	1–2	1–2		2–1	1–3	11–17 (39%)	109–142 (43%)	4
105	Turkmenistan	1–2	1–2	0–3	1–2		0–4	9–20 (31%)	111–153 (42%)	5

==== Playoffs ====
Placing	A Team	Score	B Team
Promotional	Sri Lanka	2–0	Qatar
Promotional	Jordan	0–2	Lebanon
5th	—N/a		Malaysia
Relegation	Pacific Oceania	2–1	Turkmenistan
Relegation	Syria	2–0	United Arab Emirates

- Sri Lanka and Lebanon promoted to Group II in 2018.
- Turkmenistan and United Arab Emirates relegated to Group IV in 2018.

=== Group IV ===
Date: 3–8 April

Location: Bahrain Polytechnic, Isa Town, Bahrain (hard)

Format: Round-robin basis. Two pools of five and six teams, respectively (Pools A and B). The winner of each pool plays off against the runner-up of the other pool to determine which two nations are promoted to Asia/Oceania Zone Group III in 2018.

Participating teams:

- Bahrain
- Bangladesh
- Cambodia
- Iraq
- Kyrgyzstan
- Mongolia
- Myanmar
- Oman
- Saudi Arabia
- Singapore
- Tajikistan

Seeding: The seeding was based on the Davis Cup Rankings of 20 February 2017 (shown in parentheses below).

Pot 1	Pot 2	Pot 3	Pot 4	Pot 5
1. Cambodia (101); 2. Iraq (106)	3. Bahrain (107); 4. Singapore (107)	5. Saudi Arabia (111); 6. Bangladesh (112)	7. Myanmar (120); 8. Oman (122)	9. Tajikistan (123); 10. Mongolia (124); 11. Kyrgyzstan (126)

==== Pool A ====
		CAM	KSA	MYA	BHR	KGZ	RR; W–L	Set; W–L	Game; W–L	Standings
101	Cambodia		2–1	3–0	3–0	2–1	4–0	20–8 (71%)	150–92 (62%)	1
111	Saudi Arabia	1–2		3–0	3–0	3–0	3–1	20–7 (74%)	137–91 (60%)	2
120	Myanmar	0–3	0–3		2–1	2–1	2–2	10–17 (37%)	106–140 (43%)	3
107	Bahrain	0–3	0–3	1–2		3–0	1–3	12–17 (41%)	123–141 (47%)	4
126	Kyrgyzstan	1–2	0–3	1–2	0–3		0–4	7–20 (26%)	98–150 (40%)	5

==== Pool B ====
		SGP	OMA	MGL	TJK	BAN	IRQ	RR; W–L	Set; W–L	Game; W–L	Standings
107	Singapore		1–2	3–0	3–0	3–0	3–0	4–1	27–5 (84%)	189–83 (69%)	1
122	Oman	2–1		1–2	3–0	3–0	3–0	4–1	25–9 (74%)	178–122 (59%)	2
124	Mongolia	0–3	2–1		2–1	2–1	2–1	4–1	17–15 (53%)	145–124 (54%)	3
123	Tajikistan	0–3	0–3	1–2		2–1	1–2	1–4	11–22 (33%)	124–170 (42%)	4
112	Bangladesh	0–3	0–3	1–2	1–2		2–1	1–4	9–23 (28%)	102–168 (38%)	5
106	Iraq	0–3	0–3	1–2	2–1	1–2		1–4	9–24 (27%)	117–182 (39%)	6

==== Play-offs ====
Placing	A Team	Score	B Team
Promotional	Cambodia	2–0	Oman
Promotional	Saudi Arabia	2–1	Singapore
5th–6th	Myanmar	2–1	Mongolia
7th–8th	Bahrain	1–2	Tajikistan
9th–10th	Kyrgyzstan	2–1	Bangladesh
11th	—N/a		Iraq

Cambodia and Saudi Arabia promoted to Group III in 2018.

== Europe/Africa Zone ==
=== Group I ===
Seeds: All seeds and Hungary received a bye into the second round.

1. Slovakia
2. Ukraine
3. Netherlands
4. Austria

Remaining nations:

- Belarus
- Bosnia and Herzegovina
- Hungary
- Israel
- Poland
- Portugal
- Romania

==== Draw ====
Second Round Play-offs
Bratislava, Slovakia (clay)
1	Slovakia	4
Poland	1
Ramat HaSharon, Israel (hard)
Romania	0
Israel	5

First Round Play-offs
1	Slovakia
bye
bye
Poland
Wels, Austria (clay)
Romania	1
4	Austria	4
Ramat HaSharon, Israel (hard)
Israel	0
2	Ukraine	5

First Round
1	Slovakia
bye
Hungary
bye
3	Netherlands
bye
Zenica, Bosnia and Herz. (indoor hard)
Poland	0
Bosnia and Herzegovina	5
Minsk, Belarus (indoor hard)
Romania	2
Belarus	3
bye
4	Austria
Lisbon, Portugal (indoor clay)
Israel	0
Portugal	5
bye
2	Ukraine

Second Round
Bratislava, Slovakia (indoor hard)
1	Slovakia	1
Hungary	3
Zenica, Bosnia and Herz. (indoor hard)
3	Netherlands	3
Bosnia and Herzegovina	1
Minsk, Belarus (indoor hard)
Belarus	3
4	Austria	1
Lisbon, Portugal (indoor clay)
Portugal	4
2	Ukraine	1

- Poland and Romania relegated to Group II in 2018.
- Hungary, Netherlands, Belarus, and Portugal advance to World Group Play-off.

=== Group II ===
Seeds:

1. Sweden
2. Slovenia
3. Lithuania
4. Denmark
5. Finland
6. Latvia
7. Turkey
8. South Africa

Remaining nations:

- Cyprus
- Estonia
- Georgia
- Madagascar
- Monaco
- Morocco
- Norway
- Tunisia

==== Draw ====
Relegation Play-offs
Nicosia, Cyprus (hard)
Tunisia	4
Cyprus	1
Hanko, Finland (indoor hard)
Madagascar	2
5	Finland	3
Marrakesh, Morocco (clay)
6	Latvia	2
Morocco	3
Tallinn, Estonia (indoor hard)
Estonia	3
Monaco	2

First Round
Tunis, Tunisia (hard)
1	Sweden	3
Tunisia	2
Nicosia, Cyprus (hard)
7	Turkey	4
Cyprus	1
Šiauliai, Lithuania (indoor hard)
3	Lithuania	3
Madagascar	2
Tbilisi, Georgia (indoor carpet)
5	Finland	2
Georgia	3
Jelgava, Latvia (indoor hard)
Norway	5
6	Latvia	0
Aarhus, Denmark (indoor carpet)
Morocco	1
4	Denmark	4
Centurion, South Africa (hard)
Estonia	1
8	South Africa	4
Maribor, Slovenia (indoor hard)
Monaco	2
2	Slovenia	3

Second Round
Antalya, Turkey (clay)
1	Sweden	4
7	Turkey	1
Tbilisi, Georgia (hard)
3	Lithuania	3
Georgia	2
Stavanger, Norway (indoor hard)
Norway	1
4	Denmark	4
Centurion, South Africa (hard)
8	South Africa	5
2	Slovenia	0

Third Round
Båstad, Sweden (clay)
1	Sweden	5
3	Lithuania	0
Aarhus, Denmark (indoor hard)
4	Denmark	1
8	South Africa	3

- Cyprus, Madagascar, Latvia, and Monaco relegated to Group III in 2018.
- Sweden and South Africa promoted to Group I in 2018.

=== Group III Europe ===
Date: 5–8 April

Location: Holiday Village Santa Marina, Sozopol, Bulgaria (hard)

Format: Round-robin basis. One pool of three teams (Pool A) and three pools of four teams (Pools B, C and D). The winners of each pool played-off against each other to determine which two nations were promoted to Europe/Africa Zone Group II in 2018.

Participating teams:

- Albania
- Andorra
- Armenia
- Bulgaria
- Greece
- Iceland
- Ireland
- Kosovo
- Liechtenstein
- Luxembourg
- Macedonia
- Malta
- Moldova
- Montenegro
- San Marino

Seeding: The seeding was based on the Davis Cup Rankings of 20 February 2017 (shown in parentheses below).

Pot 1	Pot 2	Pot 3
1. Bulgaria (50); 2. Moldova (61); 3. Luxembourg (67); 4. Ireland (79)	5. Macedonia (88); 6. Montenegro (92); 7. Greece (97); 8. Liechtenstein (102)	9. Malta (102); 10. Andorra (113); 11. San Marino (114); 12. Iceland (116); 13. Armenia (119); 14. Albania (125); 15. Kosovo (128)

==== Pool A ====
		BUL	GRE	ARM	RR; W–L	Set; W–L	Game; W–L	Standings
50	Bulgaria		3–0	3–0	2–0	12–1 (92%)	79–36 (69%)	1
97	Greece	0–3		3–0	1–1	7–7 (50%)	64–53 (55%)	2
119	Armenia	0–3	0–3		0–2	1–12 (8%)	23–77 (23%)	3

==== Pool B ====
		MKD	MDA	MLT	ISL	RR; W–L	Set; W–L	Game; W–L	Standings
88	Macedonia		2–1	2–1	3–0	3–0	16–4 (80%)	111–70 (61%)	1
61	Moldova	1–2		2–1	1–2	1–2	9–11 (45%)	76–90 (46%)	2
102	Malta	1–2	1–2		2–1	1–2	8–12 (40%)	77–94 (45%)	3
116	Iceland	0–3	2–1	1–2		1–2	7–13 (35%)	77–87 (47%)	4

==== Pool C ====
		LUX	LIE	ALB	SMR	RR; W–L	Set; W–L	Game; W–L	Standings
67	Luxembourg		3–0	3–0	3–0	3–0	18–1 (95%)	115–41 (74%)	1
102	Liechtenstein	0–3		3–0	2–1	2–1	11–9 (55%)	88–84 (51%)	2
125	Albania	0–3	0–3		2–1	1–2	3–16 (16%)	59–106 (36%)	3
114	San Marino	0–3	1–2	1–2		0–3	7–15 (32%)	86–117 (42%)	4

==== Pool D ====
		IRL	MNE	AND	KOS	RR; W–L	Set; W–L	Game; W–L	Standings
79	Ireland		2–1	3–0	3–0	3–0	17–2 (89%)	110–35 (76%)	1
92	Montenegro	1–2		2–1	3–0	2–1	12–5 (71%)	90–71 (56%)	2
113	Andorra	0–3	1–2		3–0	1–2	8–11 (42%)	75–86 (47%)	3
128	Kosovo	0–3	0–3	0–3		0–3	1–18 (5%)	28–111 (20%)	4

==== Playoffs ====
Placing	A Team	Score	D Team
Promotional	Bulgaria	1–2	Ireland
5th–8th	Greece	1–2	Montenegro
9th–12th	Armenia	2–1	Andorra
13th–15th	—N/a		Kosovo

Placing	B Team	Score	C Team
Promotional	Macedonia	1–2	Luxembourg
5th–8th	Moldova	2–1	Liechtenstein
9th–12th	Malta	2–1	Albania
13th–15th	Iceland	2–0	San Marino

Ireland and Luxembourg promoted to Group II in 2018.

=== Group III Africa ===
Date: 17–22 July

Location: Solaimaneyah Club, Cairo, Egypt (clay)

Format: Round-robin basis. Two pools of four and five teams, respectively (Pools A and B). The winner of each pool plays off against the runner-up of the other pool to determine which two nations are promoted to Asia/Oceania Zone Group II in 2018.

Participating teams:

- Algeria
- Benin
- Botswana
- Egypt
- Kenya
- Libya
- Nigeria
- Rwanda
- Zimbabwe

Seeding: The seeding was based on the Davis Cup Rankings of 10 April 2017 (shown in parentheses below).

Pot 1	Pot 2	Pot 3	Pot 4
1. Zimbabwe (73); 2. Algeria (81)	3. Benin (83); 4. Egypt (96)	5. Nigeria (98); 6. Kenya (117)	7. Botswana (119); 8. Rwanda (126); 9. Libya (129)

==== Pool A ====
		EGY	ZIM	NGR	RWA	RR; W–L	Set; W–L	Game; W–L	Standings
96	Egypt		3–0	3–0	3–0	3–0	18–1 (95%)	113–35 (76%)	1
73	Zimbabwe	0–3		2–1	3–0	2–1	10–9 (53%)	85–75 (53%)	2
98	Nigeria	0–3	1–2		3–0	1–2	10–10 (50%)	91–93 (49%)	3
126	Rwanda	0–3	0–3	0–3		0–3	0–18 (0%)	22–108 (17%)	4

==== Pool B ====
		KEN	BEN	ALG	LBA	BOT	RR; W–L	Set; W–L	Game; W–L	Standings
117	Kenya		2–1	2–1	2–1	3–0	4–0	20–7 (74%)	148–89 (62%)	1
83	Benin	1–2		2–1	3–0	3–0	3–1	19–8 (70%)	138–95 (59%)	2
81	Algeria	1–2	1–2		3–0	3–0	2–2	17–9 (65%)	134–86 (61%)	3
129	Libya	1–2	0–3	0–3		2–1	1–3	7–20 (26%)	83–151 (35%)	4
119	Botswana	0–3	0–3	0–3	1–2		0–4	4–23 (15%)	67–149 (31%)	5

==== Playoffs ====
Placing	A Team	Score	B Team
Promotional	Egypt	2–0	Benin
Promotional	Zimbabwe	2–0	Kenya
5th–6th	Nigeria	2–0	Algeria
7th–8th	Rwanda	2–1	Libya
9th	—N/a		Botswana

- Egypt and Zimbabwe promoted to Group II in 2018.

== Broadcasting rights ==
=== Americas ===
- Argentina: TyC Sports and América Sports
- Brazil: SporTV and BandSports
- Canada: Sportsnet and TVA Sports
- Paraguay: Tigo Sports and Personal Sports
- Uruguay: VTV
- United States: Tennis Channel

=== Europe ===
- Belgium: RTBF, Sporza and VRT
- France: beIN SPORTS
- Hungary: MTVA
- Italy: Super Tennis
- Poland: TVP Sport
- Portugal: SPORT.TV4
- Russia: Match! Arena and Match! Game
- Serbia: Radio Television of Serbia
