= 2005 Davis Cup Americas Zone Group IV =

International tennis competition

The Americas Zone was one of the three zones of the regional Davis Cup competition in 2005.

In the Americas Zone there were four different tiers, called groups, in which teams competed against each other to advance to the upper tier. The five teams in Group IV played in a single Round-robin tournament. The top two teams were promoted to the Americas Zone Group III in 2006. All other teams remained in Group IV.

== Draw ==
- Venue: Costa Rica Tennis Club, San José, Costa Rica (outdoor hard)
- Date: 13 - 17 July

Team	Pld	W	L	MF	MA
Trinidad and Tobago	4	3	1	10	2
Costa Rica	4	3	1	8	4
Barbados	4	3	1	8	4
Bermuda	4	1	3	3	9
U.S. Virgin Islands	4	0	4	1	11

Trinidad & Tobago and Costa Rica promoted to Group III for 2006.

== Results ==
=== Costa Rica vs. Bermuda ===
Costa Rica
2
Costa Rica Tennis Club, San José, Costa Rica
13 July 2005

Bermuda
1

			1	2	3
1	(Costa Rica) (Bermuda)	Ignaci Roca; Jenson Bascome	5; 7	2; 6
2	(Costa Rica) (Bermuda)	Felipe Montenegro; James Collieson	6; 0	6; 1
3	(Costa Rica) (Bermuda)	Felipe Montenegro / Ignaci Roca; Jenson Bascome / Gavin Manders	6; 3	6; 4

=== Barbados vs. Trinidad and Tobago ===
Barbados
0
Costa Rica Tennis Club, San José, Costa Rica
13 July 2005

Trinidad and Tobago
3

			1	2	3
1	(Barbados) (Trinidad and Tobago)	Russell Moseley; Richard Brown	1; 6	3; 6
2	(Barbados) (Trinidad and Tobago)	Wkwesi Williams; Shane Stone	1; 6	1; 6
3	(Barbados) (Trinidad and Tobago)	Russell Moseley / Wkwesi Williams; Shane Stone / Troy Stone	2; 6	3; 6

=== U.S. Virgin Islands vs. Bermuda ===
U.S. Virgin Islands
1
Costa Rica Tennis Club, San José, Costa Rica
14 July 2005

Bermuda
2

			1	2	3
1	(United States Virgin Islands) (Bermuda)	Henry Christian Nelthropp; Jenson Bascome	2; 6	4; 6
2	(United States Virgin Islands) (Bermuda)	Terrance Eugene Highfield; James Collieson	6; 3	6; 2
3	(United States Virgin Islands) (Bermuda)	Terrance Eugene Highfield / Henry Christian Nelthropp; Jenson Bascome / Gavin Manders	5; 7	6; 4	1; 6

=== Costa Rica vs. Barbados ===
Costa Rica
1
Costa Rica Tennis Club, San José, Costa Rica
14 July 2005

Barbados
2

			1	2	3
1	(Costa Rica) (Barbados)	Ignaci Roca; Wkwesi Williams	4; 6	5; 7
2	(Costa Rica) (Barbados)	Felipe Montenegro; Haydn Lewis	4; 6	6; 1	6; 1
3	(Costa Rica) (Barbados)	Felipe Montenegro / Marcos Salazar; Haydn Lewis / Russell Moseley	6; 4	1; 6	2; 6

=== U.S. Virgin Islands vs. Trinidad and Tobago ===
U.S. Virgin Islands
0
Costa Rica Tennis Club, San José, Costa Rica
15 July 2005

Trinidad and Tobago
3

			1	2	3
1	(United States Virgin Islands) (Trinidad and Tobago)	Henry Christian Nelthropp; Richard Brown	0; 6	2; 6
2	(United States Virgin Islands) (Trinidad and Tobago)	Terrance Eugene Highfield; Shane Stone	4; 6	6^{5} 7^{7}
3	(United States Virgin Islands) (Trinidad and Tobago)	Terrance Eugene Highfield / Whitney McFarlane; Shane Stone / Troy Stone	6; 3	1; 6	1; 6

=== Barbados vs. Bermuda ===
Barbados
3
Costa Rica Tennis Club, San José, Costa Rica
15 July 2005

Bermuda
0

			1	2	3
1	(Barbados) (Bermuda)	Russell Moseley; Jenson Bascome	6; 2	7^{7} 6^{3}
2	(Barbados) (Bermuda)	Haydn Lewis; James Collieson	7^{9} 6^{7}	6; 3
3	(Barbados) (Bermuda)	Haydn Lewis / Russell Moseley; Jenson Bascome / Gavin Manders	6; 3	3; 6	6; 3

=== U.S. Virgin Islands vs. Barbados ===
U.S. Virgin Islands
0
Costa Rica Tennis Club, San José, Costa Rica
16 July 2005

Barbados
3

			1	2	3
1	(United States Virgin Islands) (Barbados)	Jereme Cumbermack; Russell Moseley	0; 6	0; 6
2	(United States Virgin Islands) (Barbados)	Terrance Eugene Highfield; Haydn Lewis	4; 6	3; 6
3	(United States Virgin Islands) (Barbados)	Terrance Eugene Highfield / Whitney McFarlane; Haydn Lewis / Russell Moseley	2; 6	1; 6

=== Costa Rica vs. Trinidad and Tobago ===
Costa Rica
2
Costa Rica Tennis Club, San José, Costa Rica
16 July 2005

Trinidad and Tobago
1

			1	2	3
1	(Costa Rica) (Trinidad and Tobago)	Marcos Salazar; Richard Brown	0; 6	2; 6
2	(Costa Rica) (Trinidad and Tobago)	Felipe Montenegro; Brent Ching	6; 1	6; 4
3	(Costa Rica) (Trinidad and Tobago)	Felipe Montenegro / Ignaci Roca; Richard Brown / Troy Stone	6; 3	6; 2

=== U.S. Virgin Islands vs. Costa Rica ===
U.S. Virgin Islands
0
Costa Rica Tennis Club, San José, Costa Rica
17 July 2005

Costa Rica
3

			1	2	3
1	(United States Virgin Islands) (Costa Rica)	Henry Christian Nelthropp; Ignaci Roca	1; 6	2; 6
2	(United States Virgin Islands) (Costa Rica)	Terrance Eugene Highfield; Felipe Montenegro	4; 6	3; 6
3	(United States Virgin Islands) (Costa Rica)	Whitney McFarlane / Henry Christian Nelthropp; Felipe Montenegro / Ignaci Roca	4; 6	0; 6

=== Trinidad and Tobago vs. Bermuda ===
Trinidad and Tobago
3
Costa Rica Tennis Club, San José, Costa Rica
17 July 2005

Bermuda
0

			1	2	3
1	(Trinidad and Tobago) (Bermuda)	Richard Brown; Gavin Manders	6; 1	6; 0
2	(Trinidad and Tobago) (Bermuda)	Brent Ching; Jenson Bascome	6; 2	6; 4
3	(Trinidad and Tobago) (Bermuda)	Brent Ching / Troy Stone; Romar Douglas / James Collieson	6; 3	6; 0
