= Quinton Vega =

American tennis player

- Country (sports): United States; Puerto Rico (Davis Cup)
- Residence: Brooklyn, New York, U.S.
- Born: 22 November 1992 (age 33) Brooklyn, New York, U.S.
- Height: 1.85 m (6 ft 1 in)
- Plays: Right-handed (two-handed backhand)
- Prize money: US $12,192

Singles
- Career record: 0–2 (at ATP Tour level, Grand Slam level, and in Davis Cup)
- Career titles: 0
- Highest ranking: No. 980 (November 7, 2016)

Doubles
- Career record: 0–1 (at ATP Tour level, Grand Slam level, and in Davis Cup)
- Career titles: 2 ITF
- Highest ranking: No. 736 (June 27, 2016)

Quinton Vega (born 22 November 1992) is an American tennis player. Vega has a career high ATP singles ranking of No. 980 achieved on November 7, 2016 and a career high ATP doubles ranking of No. 736 achieved on June 27, 2016.

Vega represents Puerto Rico at the Davis Cup, where he has a W/L record of 4–1.
