= Luis Gómez (tennis) =

Panamanian tennis player

- Country (sports): Panama
- Born: 18 December 1992 (age 33) Panama City, Panama
- Plays: Right-handed
- Prize money: $0

Singles
- Career record: 1–2 (at ATP Tour level, Grand Slam level, and in Davis Cup)
- Career titles: 0

Doubles
- Career record: 1–3 (at ATP Tour level, Grand Slam level, and in Davis Cup)
- Career titles: 0
- Last updated on: 3 April 2017.

Luis Gómez (born 18 December 1992) is a Panamanian tennis player.

Gómez makes appearances at the Visit Panamá Cup.

Gómez represents Panama at the Davis Cup where he has a singles W/L record of 2–3, and a doubles W/L of 4–8. The Group III Americas event took place 17 to 22 June 2019 at the Escazu Country Club in Costa Rica on hard court, and Gómez participated in both singles and doubles. The Panama team beat the Honduras, Bermuda, and Trinidad & Tobago teams 2–1 but lost to the Jamaica and Cuba teams 1–2.
