= Jesse Flores (tennis) =

Costa Rican tennis player

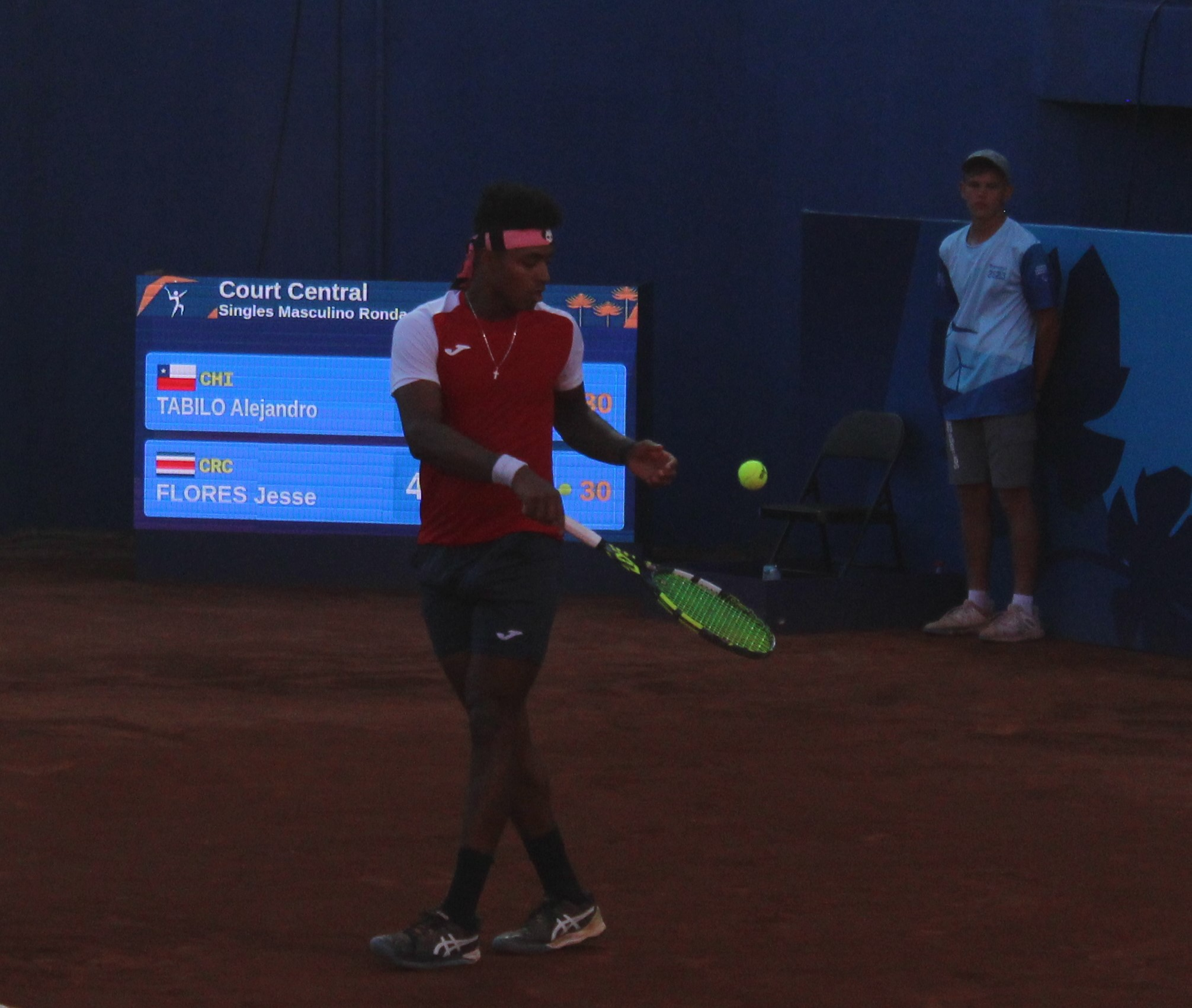
- Flores at the 2023 Pan American Games
- Full name: Jesse Armando Flores Knowles
- Country (sports): Costa Rica
- Residence: Canada
- Born: 31 March 1995 (age 31) Oakville, Ontario, Canada
- Height: 1.88 m (6 ft 2 in)
- Plays: Right-handed (two-handed backhand)
- College: University of Miami
- Prize money: US $53,275

Singles
- Career record: 0–3 (at ATP Tour level, Grand Slam level, and in Davis Cup)
- Career titles: 0
- Highest ranking: No. 759 (22 July 2024)
- Current ranking: No. 873 (14 September 2026)

Doubles
- Career record: 1–1 (at ATP Tour level, Grand Slam level, and in Davis Cup)
- Career titles: 0
- Highest ranking: No. 480 (19 May 2025)
- Current ranking: No. 1,016 (14 September 2026)
- Last updated on: 18 September 2026.

Jesse Armando Flores Knowles (born 31 March 1995) is a Costa Rican professional tennis player. He has a career-high ATP singles ranking of world No. 759 achieved on 22 July 2024 and a doubles ranking of No. 480 achieved on 19 May 2025.

Flores represents Costa Rica at the Davis Cup, where he has a W/L record of 9–3.

== ITF World Tennis Tour finals ==
=== Doubles: 9 (2 titles, 7 runner-ups) ===
Legend ITF WTT (2–7)	Finals by surface Hard (2–7) Clay (0–0)

Result	W–L	Date	Tournament	Tier	Surface	Partner	Opponents	Score
Loss	0–1	Sep 2021	M15 Cancún, Mexico	WTT	Hard	(United States) Nicholas Bybel	(United States) Dali Blanch (France) Tom Jomby	4–6, 5–7
Loss	0–2	Sep 2022	M15 Cancún, Mexico	WTT	Clay	(Venezuela) Ricardo Rodríguez-Pace	(United States) Tristan McCormick (United Kingdom) Hamish Stewart	3–6, 5–7
Win	1–2	Nov 2022	M15 Santo Domingo, Dominican Republic	WTT	Hard	(Canada) Liam Draxl	(Dominican Republic) Peter Bertran (United States) Joshua Sheehy	6–0, 6–3
Loss	1–3	Dec 2022	M15 Santo Domingo, Dominican Republic	WTT	Hard	(United States) Joshua Sheehy	(United States) Trey Hilderbrand (United States) Noah Schachter	3–6, 4–6
Loss	1–4	May 2023	M15 Tabasco, Mexico	WTT	Hard (i)	(United States) Joshua Sheehy	(Peru) Juan Carlos Aguilar (Peru) Jorge Panta	3–6, 7–6^{(7–4)}, [7–10]
Loss	1–5	Nov 2023	M15 Alcalá de Henares, Spain	WTT	Hard	(New Zealand) Finn Reynolds	(United Kingdom) Hamish Stewart (United Kingdom) George Houghton	4–6, 7–6^{(7–3)}, [12–14]
Loss	1–6	Feb 2024	M15 Monastir, Tunisia	WTT	Hard	(Italy) Luca Potenza	Igor Kudriashov; Aleksandr Lobanov	3–6, 6–0, [12–14]
Win	2–6	May 2024	M15 Monastir, Tunisia	WTT	Hard	(Italy) Elio José Ribeiro Lago	(Jordan) Mousa Alkotop (Jordan) Mohammad Alkotop	2–6, 6–4, [13–11]
Loss	2–7	Jun 2024	M15 Hillcrest, South Africa	WTT	Hard	(South Africa) Vasilios Caripi	(South Africa) Alec Beckley (Bulgaria) Alexander Donski	6–7^{(5–7)}, 4–6
