= Saint Lucia Davis Cup team =

The Saint Lucia Davis Cup team represents Saint Lucia in the Davis Cup tennis competition. They are governed by the St. Lucia Lawn Tennis Association, and they have not competed since 2006.

Their best finish is eighth in Group III.

== History ==
Saint Lucia competed in its first Davis Cup in 1998. They had previously competed as part of the Eastern Caribbean team.

== Last team (2006) ==
- Trevor Hunte (Captain-player)
- Vernon Lewis
- Sirsean Arlain
- Alberton Richelieu

== See also ==
- Davis Cup
