= Antigua and Barbuda Davis Cup team =

National tennis team

The Antigua and Barbuda men's national tennis team represents Antigua and Barbuda in Davis Cup tennis competition and is governed by the Antigua and Barbuda Tennis Association.

== History ==
Antigua and Barbuda competed in its first Davis Cup in 1996. Their best result was third in Group III in 1997. After the 2001 tournament, they went inactive and did not compete again until 2017.

== Current team (2022) ==
- Jody Maginley
- Cordell Williams
- Kyle Joseph
- Ron Murraine
- Carlton Bedminster

== See also ==
- Davis Cup
- Antigua and Barbuda Billie Jean King Cup team
