= Carlton Bedminster =

Antiguan tennis player

- Full name: Carlton Edward Bedminster Jr.
- Country (sports): Antigua and Barbuda
- Born: 8 November 1982 (age 43)
- Height: 1.82 m (6 ft 0 in)

Singles
- Career record: 0–0 (at ATP Tour level, Grand Slam level)
- Career titles: 0; 0 Challenger, 0 Futures

Doubles
- Career record: 0–0 (at ATP Tour level, Grand Slam level)
- Career titles: 0; 0 Challenger, 0 Futures

Team competitions
- Davis Cup: 10–24
Medal record
Men's tennis
Representing Antigua and Barbuda
Eastern Caribbean Championship
Gold medal – first place	2006 Carlisle Bay	Singles
Gold medal – first place	2015 Gros Islet	Doubles
Silver medal – second place	2015 Gros Islet	Singles
- Last updated on: 15 July 2019.

Carlton Bedminster (born 8 November 1982) is an Antiguan tennis player.

Bedminster hasn't won an ITF title.

Bedminster has represented Antigua and Barbuda at Davis Cup. In Davis Cup he has a win-loss record of 10–24.

He won the Eastern Caribbean Tennis Championship in 2006 at the final, he defeated his fellow countryman Carl Johnson 6-3, 6-4. In 2015 he won doubles with Kevin Gardner. In singles he lost the final against the Saint Lucian Vernon Lewis 6-7, 0-6.

In 2007 Bedminster competed at the Pan American Games in Rio de Janeiro, Brazil. At singles he lost in the first round against Yohny Romero. In doubles with Kevin Gardner lost against the number one seeded Chilean Jorge Aguilar, Adrián García duo on the second round.

He competed at the 2018 Central American and Caribbean Games, in doubles with Jody Maginley.

== Davis Cup ==
=== Participations: (10–24) ===
Group membership World Group (0–0) WG Play-off (0–0) Group I (0–0) Group II (0–0) Group III (3–15) Group IV (7–9)	Matches by surface Hard (7–10) Clay (3–14) Grass (0–0) Carpet (0–0)	Matches by type Singles (6–10) Doubles (4–14)
