= U.S. Virgin Islands Davis Cup team =

National tennis team

The United States Virgin Islands Davis Cup team represents the United States Virgin Islands in Davis Cup tennis competition and are governed by the Virgin Islands Tennis Association. They have not competed since 2012.

Their best finish is seventh in Group III.

== History ==
The US Virgin Islands competed in its first Davis Cup in 1998.

== Current team (2024) ==
- Tomas del Olmo
- Jan Neuburger
- Finlay Miller
- Imani Beharry
- Yared Alfred (Junior Player)
- Luca del Olmo (Captain)

== See also ==
- Davis Cup
- U.S. Virgin Islands Billie Jean King Cup team
