= Honduras Davis Cup team =

National tennis team

- Captain: Angel Calix
- ITF ranking: 90
- First year: 1998
- Years played: 10
- Ties played (W–L): 50 (29-21)
- Davis Cup titles: 0
- Runners-up: 0
- Most total wins: Carlos Caceres (35-26)
- Most singles wins: Calton Alvarez (26-15)
- Most doubles wins: Carlos Caceres (11-16)
- Best doubles team: Christian Kawas / Carlos Caceres (6-1)
- Most ties played: Carlos Caceres (44)
- Most years played: Calton Alvarez (10)

The Honduras men's national tennis team represents Honduras in Davis Cup tennis competition and are governed by the Federación Hondureña de Tenis.

Honduras currently compete in the Americas Zone of Group III. Their best finish is fifth in Group III.

== History ==
Honduras competed in its first Davis Cup in 1998.

== Current team (2022) ==
- Alejandro Obando
- Keny Turcios
- Mario Richmagui (Junior player)
- Edwin Marcia (Captain-player)

== See also ==
- Davis Cup
- Honduras Billie Jean King Cup team
