= Bermuda Davis Cup team =

National tennis team

The Bermuda men's national tennis team represents Bermuda in Davis Cup tennis competition and are governed by the Bermuda Lawn Tennis Association.

Their best finish is World Group II Qualifiers.

== History ==
Bermuda competed in its first Davis Cup in 1995.

== Current team (2025) ==
- Richard 'Trey' Mallory III
- Tariq Simons
- Daniel Phillips
- Jenson Bascome
- Richard Mallory Jr. (Coach/Captain)

== See also ==
- Davis Cup
- Bermuda Billie Jean King Cup team
