= Moreno (surname) =

Moreno (Spanish: [moˈɾeno]; Portuguese: [muˈɾenu, mo-]) is a Spanish, Portuguese, Ladino, Sephardic, French, and occasionally, an Italian surname. It may refer to:

== Arts and entertainment ==
- Alma Moreno (born 1959), Filipina actress
- Antonio Moreno (1887–1967), American actor and film director, originally from Spain
- Belita Moreno (born 1949), Mexican-American actress
- Carlos Buddy Moreno (1912–2015), American vocalist and bandleader of the 1940s
- Carmen Moreno (singer) (1926–2025), Polish jazz singer and dancer
- Catalina Sandino Moreno (born 1981), Colombian actress
- Chino Moreno (born 1973), American singer and musician
- Claudia Moreno (born 1977), Venezuelan beauty-pageant title holder
- Darío Moreno (1921–1968), Turkish pop singer
- Enrique Moreno González (born 1939), Spanish surgeon
- Esther Moreno (born 1969), Mexican wrestler
- Fabio Moreno Fell (born 2000), Spanish footballer
- Federico Moreno Torroba (1891–1982), Spanish composer
- Gaby Moreno (born 1981), Guatemalan singer, songwriter and guitarist
- German Moreno (1933–2016), Filipino TV host, talent manager, actor, and comedian.
- Helena Moreno (actress), (born 1989), Angolan actress
- Juan Moreno y Herrera–Jiménez (born 1948), French actor of Spanish origin, better known as Jean Reno
- Jorge Moreno (footballer) (born 2001), Spanish footballer
- Jorge Moreno (musician) (born 1975), Grammy-winning Cuban-American singer
- José Elías Moreno (1910–1969), Mexican character actor
- José María Moreno (born 1951), Spanish poet, translator and teacher
- Joyce Moreno (musician) (born 1948), Brazilian singer/songwriter, guitarist and arranger
- Leticia Moreno (born 1985), Spanish violinist
- Lucha Moreno (1939–2026), Mexican singer and actress
- Marguerite Moreno (1871–1948), French actress
- María José Moreno (born 1967), Spanish soprano
- Mario Moreno (1911–1993), Mexican comedian/actor better known as Cantinflas
- Miguel Moreno (1596–1655), Spanish poet
- Nicolás Moreno (artist) (1923–2012), Mexican landscape painter
- Pepe Moreno (born 1954), Spanish comic book artist and writer
- Pitoy Moreno (1925–2018), Filipino fashion designer
- Rita Moreno (born 1931), Puerto Rican actress, dancer and singer
- Rodrigo Moreno (born 1972), Argentine film director and screenwriter
- Ruby Moreno (born 1965), Filipino film actress
- Silvina Moreno (born 1987), Argentine singer

== Military and police ==
- Arturo Durazo Moreno (1924–2000), chief of police of Mexico City 1976 to 1982
- Audelino Moreno (1919–2010), Venezuelan officer and diplomat
- Bonaventura Moreno (fl. 1791), rear admiral of the Spanish Navy
- Emmanuel Moreno (1971–2006), Israeli lieutenant colonel
- Francisco Moreno Fernández (admiral) (1883–1945), Spanish admiral

== Politics ==
- Alberto Moreno (politician) (born 1941), Peruvian politician
- Bernie Moreno (born 1967), Colombian-American politician and businessman
- Carlos Moreno de Caro (born 1946), Colombian conservative politician, ambassador to South Africa
- Carmen Moreno, Spanish diplomat
- Celso Cesare Moreno (1830–1901), Italian sea captain, traveller, political activist and writer
- Denise Moreno Ducheny (born 1952), American politician
- Gabriel García Moreno (1821–1875), President of Ecuador
- Helena Moreno (born 1977), United States journalist and politician
- Isko Moreno (born 1974), Filipino TV actor and current mayor of the city of Manila
- Javier Moreno (politician) (born 1965), Spanish politician and Member of the European Parliament
- Julio Enrique Moreno (1879–1952), former President of Ecuador
- Lenín Moreno (born 1953), President of Ecuador
- Luis Alberto Moreno (born 1953), Colombian diplomat and journalist, president of the Inter-American Development Bank
- María de los Ángeles Moreno (1945–2019), Mexican politician
- Mariano Moreno (1778–1811), Argentine lawyer, journalist and politician
- Mario Anguiano Moreno (born 1962), Mexican politician, member of the Institutional Revolutionary Party
- Maurizio Moreno (1940–2016), Italian diplomat; former ambassador to Senegal and Czechoslovakia; president, International Institute of Humanitarian Law, 2007
- Nahuel Moreno (Hugo Bressano, 1924–1987), Argentine politician
- Paul Moreno (1931–2017), American politician
- Proco Joe Moreno (born 1972), American politician

== Science and learning ==
- Carlos J. Moreno, Colombian mathematician
- Francisco Moreno (1852–1919), Argentine explorer and academic commonly called Perito Moreno
- Francisco Moreno Fernández (linguist) (born 1960), Spanish dialectologist and sociolinguist
- Hugo Moreno Roa, Chilean volcanologist
- Jacob L. Moreno (1889–1974), Austro-Romanian psychotherapist, founder of psychodrama
- José Luis Ortiz Moreno, Spanish astronomer
- José Miguel Moreno (born 1946), Spanish specialist of historical plucked string instruments
- Óscar Moreno (1878–1971), Portuguese urologist

== Sports ==
- Agustín Moreno (born 1967), Mexican former tennis player
- Alberto Moreno (born 1992), Spanish footballer
- Alberto Ortiz Moreno (born 1985), Spanish footballer
- Alejandro Moreno (born 1979), Venezuelan footballer
- Alex Moreno (rugby union) (born 1973), Argentine retired rugby union player
- Alfredo Moreno (1980–2021), Argentine footballer
- Àngels Moreno (born 2004), Spanish canoeist
- Aníbal Moreno (born 1999), Argentinian footballer
- Ariadna Chueca Moreno (born 1991), Spanish basketball referee
- Arte Moreno (born 1946), owner of the Anaheim Angels baseball team
- Brandon Moreno (born 1993), Mexican flyweight mixed martial arts fighter
- Byron Moreno (born 1969), Ecuadorian football referee
- Carla Moreno (born 1976), Brazilian triathlon athlete
- Carlos Alfaro Moreno (born 1964), Argentine former footballer
- Carlos Bernardo Moreno (born 1967), Chilean sprinter
- Daniel Moreno (born 1981), Spanish road racing cyclist
- Dayro Moreno (born 1985), Colombian footballer
- Frank Moreno (born 1965), Cuban judoka
- Gabriel Moreno (born 2000), Venezuelan baseball player
- Gerard Moreno (born 1992), Spanish footballer
- Giovanni Moreno (born 1986), Colombian footballer
- Héctor Moreno (born 1988), Mexican footballer
- Héctor Moreno (racewalker) (born 1963), Colombian retired racewalker
- Henry Moreno (1930–2007), American jockey
- Henry M. Moreno (1929–2020), American trainer of American Quarter Horses and Thoroughbred
- Jaime Moreno (born 1974), Bolivian footballer
- Javier Moreno (cyclist) (born 1984), Spanish racing cyclist
- Joaquín Moreno (born 1973), Mexican football manager
- Jorge Andújar Moreno (born 1987), Spanish footballer known as "Coke"
- José Manuel Moreno (1916–1978), Argentine footballer
- José Manuel Moreno (cyclist) (born 1969), Spanish cyclist and Olympic champion
- José Moreno Mora (born 1981), Colombian footballer
- José Moreno (baseball) (1957–2019), former Major League Baseball infielder and current minor league manager
- José Moreno (tennis), Spanish former tennis player
- Joyce Moreno (footballer) (born 1974), Spanish footballer
- Juan Gutiérrez Moreno (born 1976), Spanish footballer
- Juan Moreno (pitcher) (born 1975), Venezuelan baseball player
- Julio Moreno (baseball) (1921–1987), Cuban-born professional baseball player
- Julio Moreno (fencer), Chilean Olympic fencer
- Julio Alberto Moreno (born 1958), Spanish former footballer
- Julio César Moreno (born 1969), Chilean football coach
- Karla Moreno (born 1988), Nicaraguan weightlifter
- Katerine Moreno (born 1974), Bolivian swimmer
- Knowshon Moreno (born 1987), American football running back
- Lena Moreno, Spanish taekwondo practitioner
- Levin Moreno (born 1989), Colombian para-athlete
- Luis Moreno (footballer), Panamanian footballer
- Luis Antonio Moreno, retired Colombian footballer
- Malachi Moreno (born 2006), American basketball player
- Manuel Jiménez Moreno (1902–1967), Spanish bullfighter
- Marcelo Martins Moreno, Bolivian footballer
- Marlos Moreno (born 1996), footballer
- Moses Moreno (born 1975), American football quarterback
- Nicolás Moreno (footballer, born 1928), Argentine footballer
- Nicolás Moreno (footballer, born 1994), Argentine footballer
- Nuria Moreno (born 1975), Spanish field hockey player
- Omar Moreno (born 1952), Major League Baseball outfielder born in Panama
- Orber Moreno (born 1977), Venezuelan baseball player
- Pedro Juan Moreno (born 2007), Colombian racing driver
- Pichichi (footballer) (1892–1922), Spanish footballer born Rafael Moreno Aranzadi
- Ricardo Moreno (1937–2008), Mexican featherweight boxer
- Robeiro Moreno (born 1969), Colombian football defender
- Roberto Moreno (born 1959), Brazilian Formula One driver
- Rodrigo (footballer, born 1991), Spanish footballer
- Rodrigo Moreno (athlete) (born 1966), Colombian race walker
- Rossy Moreno (born 1965), Mexican wrestler
- Sebastián Moreno (born 1992), Salvadoran tennis player
- Sergio Moreno (footballer, born 1992), Panamanian footballer
- Toñi Moreno (born 1973), Spanish journalist and presenter
- Tressor Moreno (born 1979), Colombian footballer
- Vicente Moreno (born 1974), Spanish football manager
- Víctor Moreno (born 1979), American baseball pitcher
- Víctor Moreno (cyclist) (born 1985), Venezuelan road cyclist
- Walter José Moreno (born 1978), Colombian footballer
- Yaniela Forgas Moreno (born 1992), Cuban chess grandmaster
- Yipsi Moreno (born 1980), Cuban hammer thrower
- Zeke Moreno (born 1978), American football player

== Other ==
- Arnulfo Moreno Quiñonez (born 1979), Colombian Roman Catholic bishop
- Carlos R. Moreno, Associate justice of the Supreme Court of California
- Consuelo Moreno-López (1893–2004), Spanish supercentenarian
- Eliseo Moreno (1959–1987), American murderer
- Ezequiél Moreno y Díaz (1848–1906), member of the Order of Augustinian Recollects, now venerated as a saint in the Roman Catholic Church
- Francisco Moreno (bishop) (born 1950), Anglican Archbishop of Mexico
- Glen Moreno (born 1943), American businessman
- Luis Moreno Ocampo (born 1952), Argentine jurist, chief prosecutor for the International Criminal Court
- Genesse Ivonne Moreno, female gunman responsible for the Lakewood Church shooting

== See also ==
- Moreni (surname)
- Moreno (given name)
- Moreno (disambiguation)
- Morena (disambiguation)
- Zew Wawa Morejno (1916–2011), Polish chief rabbi
