= Nicolás Moreno =

Nicolás Moreno may refer to:

- Nicolás Moreno (artist) (1923–2012), Mexican landscape painter
- Nicolás Moreno (footballer, born 1928), Argentine footballer
- Nicolás Moreno (footballer, born 1994), Argentine defender
