= 2009 Davis Cup Americas Zone Group I =

International tennis competition

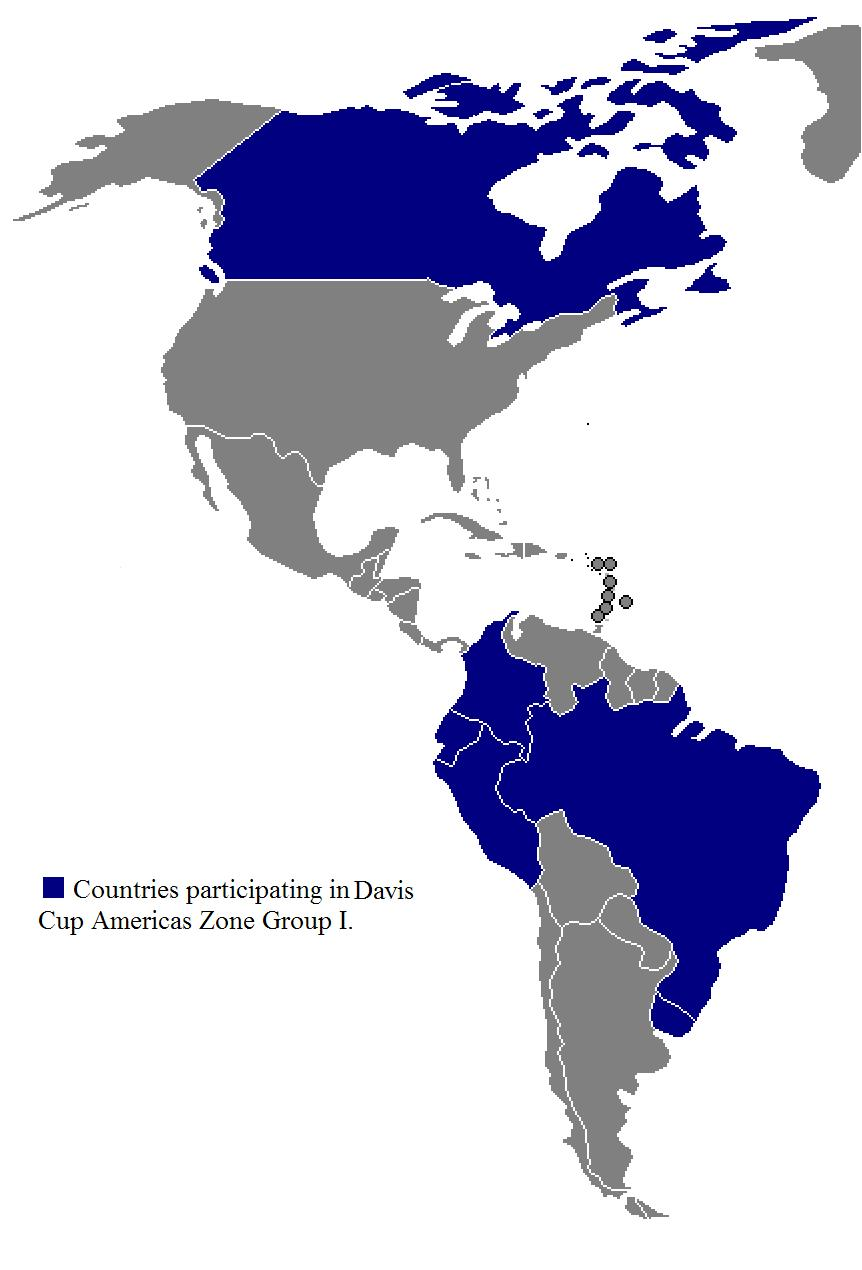
Countries participating in the 2009 Davis Cup Americas Zone Group I

The Americas Zone is one of the three zones of regional Davis Cup competition in 2009.

In the Americas Zone there are four different groups in which teams compete against each other to advance to the next group.

== Participating teams ==
- Brazil
- Canada
- Colombia
- Ecuador
- Peru
- Uruguay

== Draw ==
Relegation Play-offs; Final
Lima, Peru (clay)
Uruguay	4
2	Peru	1

Relegation Play-offs; Semifinals
bye
Uruguay
Lima, Peru (clay)
Canada	3
2	Peru	2

First Round
1	Brazil
bye
Bogotá, Colombia (clay)
Uruguay	0
Colombia	5
Toronto, Canada (indoor hard)
Canada	2
Ecuador	3
bye
2	Peru

Second Round
Tunja, Colombia (clay)
1	Brazil	4
Colombia	1
Quito, Ecuador (clay)
Ecuador	4
2	Peru	1

- Peru relegated to Group II in 2010.
- Brazil and Ecuador advanced to World Group play-offs.

== First round ==
=== Uruguay vs. Colombia ===
Uruguay
0
Centro de Alto Rendimiento, Bogotá, Colombia
6–8 March 2009
clay (outdoors)

Colombia
5

			1	2	3	4	5
1	(Uruguay) (Colombia)	Marcel Felder; Alejandro Falla	4; 6	0; 6	7^{7} 6^{4}	3; 6
2	(Uruguay) (Colombia)	Federico Sansonetti; Santiago Giraldo	4; 6	5; 7	1; 6
3	(Uruguay) (Colombia)	Ariel Behar / Marcel Felder; Juan-Sebastian Cabal / Alejandro Falla	3; 6	7; 5	6^{6} 7^{8}	4; 6
4	(Uruguay) (Colombia)	Darío Acosta; Carlos Salamanca	0; 6	3; 6
5	(Uruguay) (Colombia)	Federico Sansonetti; Juan-Sebastian Cabal	2; 6	3; 6

=== Canada vs. Ecuador ===
Canada
2
Rexall Centre – Centre of Excellence, Toronto, Canada
6–8 March 2009
hard (indoors)

Ecuador
3

			1	2	3	4	5
1	(Canada) (Ecuador)	Frédéric Niemeyer; Nicolás Lapentti	3; 6	6^{4} 7^{7}	6^{4} 7^{7}
2	(Canada) (Ecuador)	Frank Dancevic; Giovanni Lapentti	6; 4	6; 4	7; 5
3	(Canada) (Ecuador)	Daniel Nestor / Frédéric Niemeyer; Giovanni Lapentti / Nicolás Lapentti	6; 4	6; 3	6; 3
4	(Canada) (Ecuador)	Frank Dancevic; Nicolás Lapentti	6; 3	5; 7	6; 4	6^{6} 7^{8}	1; 6
5	(Canada) (Ecuador)	Frédéric Niemeyer; Giovanni Lapentti	6; 2	6^{5} 7^{7}	3; 6	3; 6

== Second round ==
=== Colombia vs. Brazil ===
Colombia
1
Parque Recreacional del Norte, Tunja, Colombia
8–10 May 2009
clay (outdoors)

Brazil
4

			1	2	3	4	5
1	(Colombia) (Brazil)	Alejandro Falla; Thomaz Bellucci	6^{5} 7^{7}	6; 3	6^{6} 7^{8}	2; 6
2	(Colombia) (Brazil)	Santiago Giraldo; Franco Ferreiro	3; 6	4; 6	7^{7} 6^{3}	6^{1} 7^{7}
3	(Colombia) (Brazil)	Juan-Sebastian Cabal / Alejandro Falla; Marcelo Melo / André Sá	3; 6	6^{4} 7^{7}	6; 4	6; 4	3; 6
4	(Colombia) (Brazil)	Carlos Salamanca; Thomaz Bellucci	7^{7} 6^{5}	1; 6	5; 7
5	(Colombia) (Brazil)	Juan-Sebastian Cabal; Franco Ferreiro	6; 2	6; 3

=== Ecuador vs. Peru ===
Ecuador
4
Club Buenavista, Quito, Ecuador
8–10 May 2009
clay (outdoors)

Peru
1

			1	2	3	4	5
1	(Ecuador) (Peru)	Giovanni Lapentti; Iván Miranda	6; 2	6; 3	7; 5
2	(Ecuador) (Peru)	Nicolás Lapentti; Mauricio Echazú	6; 2	7; 5	6; 3
3	(Ecuador) (Peru)	Giovanni Lapentti / Nicolás Lapentti; Sergio Galdos / Iván Miranda	7; 5	6; 3	6; 3
4	(Ecuador) (Peru)	Carlos Avellán; Iván Miranda	6; 4	6; 4
5	(Ecuador) (Peru)	Júlio César Campozano; Sergio Galdos	4; 6	7^{7} 6^{2}	2; 6

== Relegation play-offs ==
=== Semifinals ===
==== Canada vs. Peru ====
Canada
3
Club Lawn Tennis De La Exposicion, Lima, Peru
10–12 July 2009
clay (outdoors)

Peru
2

			1	2	3	4	5
1	(Canada) (Peru)	Peter Polansky; Iván Miranda	7^{7} 6^{5}	6; 4	6; 4
2	(Canada) (Peru)	Bruno Agostinelli; Luis Horna	2; 6	6^{2} 7^{7}	6; 4	5; 7
3	(Canada) (Peru)	Daniel Nestor / Frédéric Niemeyer; Luis Horna / Iván Miranda	6^{3} 7^{7}	7; 5	7^{7} 6^{4}	4; 6	6; 3
4	(Canada) (Peru)	Frédéric Niemeyer; Luis Horna	6^{4} 7^{7}	6; 4	4; 6	5; 7
5	(Canada) (Peru)	Bruno Agostinelli; Iván Miranda	7^{7} 6^{4}	1; 6	6; 3	6; 4

=== Final ===
==== Uruguay vs. Peru ====
Uruguay
4
Club Tennis Las Terrazas Miraflores, Lima, Peru
18–20 September 2009
clay (outdoors)

Peru
1

			1	2	3	4	5
1	(Uruguay) (Peru)	Marcel Felder; Luis Horna	6; 2	6; 3	6; 1
2	(Uruguay) (Peru)	Pablo Cuevas; Mauricio Echazú	6; 4	6; 3	6; 2
3	(Uruguay) (Peru)	Pablo Cuevas / Marcel Felder; Luis Horna / Iván Miranda	7^{7} 6^{2}	3; 6	6; 3	6; 2
4	(Uruguay) (Peru)	Federico Sansonetti; Iván Miranda	7; 5	7^{7} 6^{2}
5	(Uruguay) (Peru)	Ariel Behar; Mauricio Echazú	2; 6	3; 6
