= Carlos Moreno =

Carlos Moreno may refer to:

- Carlos J. Moreno, mathematician
- Carlos R. Moreno (born 1948), U.S. jurist, ambassador to Belize
- Carlos Moreno de Caro (born 1946), Colombian politician, ambassador to South Africa
- Carlos Moreno (footballer, born 1992), Spanish footballer
- Carlos Bernardo Moreno (born 1967), Chilean track and field athlete
- Carlos Moreno (actor) (1938–2014), Argentine actor
- Carlos Moreno (producer), Mexican telenovelas producer
- Carlos Moreno (urbanist) (born 1959), Franco-Colombian academic, promoter of the 15-minute city
- Carlos Moreno (footballer, born 1998), Mexican footballer

== See also ==
- Carlos Alfaro Moreno (born 1964), Argentine footballer
- Carlos David Moreno (born 1986), Spanish footballer known as Carlos David
