= Moreni (disambiguation) =

Moreni is a town in Dâmbovița County, Romania.

Moreni may also refer to:

== Places in Romania ==
- Moreni, a village in Cetate Commune, Dolj County
- Moreni, a village in Prisăcani Commune, Iași County
- Moreni, a village in Văleni Commune, Neamț County
- Moreni, a village in Deleni Commune, Vaslui County
- Moreni (river), a tributary of the Tazlău in Bacău County

== Other uses ==
- Moreni (surname), an Italian surname
- Moreni oil field, an oil field located in Moreni, Dâmbovița County
