= Matías Míguez =

Argentine professional footballer

Personal information
- Full name: Matías Nicolás Míguez
- Date of birth: 9 February 1994 (age 32)
- Place of birth: San Isidro, Argentina
- Height: 1.82 m (6 ft 0 in)
- Position: Defender

Team information
- Current team: Sacachispas

Youth career
- Acassuso
- 2017–2018: Fénix

Senior career*
Years	Team	Apps	(Gls)
2018–2019	Deportivo Español	5	(0)
2019–2020	Tristán Suárez	0	(0)
2020–	Sacachispas	0	(0)
- * Club domestic league appearances and goals as of 19:53, 21 October 2020 (UTC)

Matías Nicolás Míguez (born 9 February 1994) is an Argentine professional footballer who plays as a defender for Sacachispas.

== Career ==
Míguez played for Acassuso and Fénix at youth level, before starting his senior career with Deportivo Español in 2018. Míguez made the breakthrough during 2018–19, as he made his debut in a 3–0 loss to Deportivo Riestra on 8 September 2018; replacing Nicolás Moreno after eighty-three minutes. His first start arrived a week later in a Primera B Metropolitana fixture with former team Acassuso. He made a total of five appearances in 2018–19, before departing in June 2019 to Tristán Suárez. However, the defender didn't appear competitively for the club. August 2020 saw Míguez join fellow third tier team Sacachispas.

== Career statistics ==
As of 21 October 2020.

Appearances and goals by club, season and competition
Club	Season	League			Cup		League Cup		Continental		Other		Total	
Club	Season	Division	Apps	Goals	Apps	Goals	Apps	Goals	Apps	Goals	Apps	Goals	Apps	Goals
Deportivo Español	2018–19	Primera B Metropolitana	5	0	0	0	—		—		0	0	5	0
Tristán Suárez	2019–20	Primera B Metropolitana	0	0	0	0	—		—		0	0	0	0
Sacachispas	2020–21	Primera B Metropolitana	0	0	0	0	—		—		0	0	0	0
Career total			5	0	0	0	—		—		0	0	5	0
