= 2010 Davis Cup Americas Zone Group II =

Tennis competition

The Americas Zone is one of the three zones of regional Davis Cup competition in 2010.

In the Americas Zone there are four different groups in which teams compete against each other to advance to the next group.

== Participating teams ==
=== Seeds ===
1. Peru
2. Mexico
3. Paraguay
4. Venezuela

=== Other Nations ===
- Netherlands Antilles
- Bolivia
- El Salvador
- Guatemala

== Draw ==
Play-offs
Cochabamba, Bolivia
El Salvador	4
Bolivia	1
Guatemala City, Guatemala
Netherlands Antilles	3
Guatemala	2

First Round
Lima, Peru
1	Peru	5
El Salvador	0
La Paz, Bolivia
Bolivia	1
4	Venezuela	4
Lambaré, Paraguay
3	Paraguay	4
Netherlands Antilles	1
Mexico City, Mexico
2	Mexico	5
Guatemala	0

Second Round
Maracaibo, Venezuela
1	Peru	1
4	Venezuela	3
Encarnación, Paraguay
3	Paraguay	1
2	Mexico	4

Third Round
Mexico
4	Venezuela	1
2	Mexico	4

- Bolivia and Guatemala relegated to Group III in 2011.
- Mexico promoted to Group I in 2011.

== First round ==
=== Peru vs. El Salvador ===
Peru
5
Club Lawn Tennis De La Exposicion, Lima, Peru
5–7 March 2010
Clay

El Salvador
0

			1	2	3	4	5
1	(Peru) (El Salvador)	Iván Miranda; Rafael Arévalo	6; 3	6; 2	7; 5
2	(Peru) (El Salvador)	Mauricio Echazú; Marcelo Arévalo	2; 6	6; 2	6; 4	3; 6	6; 3
3	(Peru) (El Salvador)	Sergio Galdós / Iván Miranda; Marcelo Arévalo / Rafael Arévalo	7; 5	3; 6	6^{4} 7^{7}	6; 4	6; 4
4	(Peru) (El Salvador)	Álvaro Raposo de Oliveira; Marcelo Arévalo	7; 5	6; 3
5	(Peru) (El Salvador)	Sergio Galdós; Sebastián Moreno	6; 0	6; 0

=== Venezuela vs. Bolivia ===
Venezuela
4
Club De Tenis La Paz, La Paz, Bolivia
5–7 March 2010
Clay

Bolivia
1

			1	2	3	4	5
1	(Venezuela) (Bolivia)	Yohny Romero; Federico Zeballos	7^{12} 6^{10}	6; 2	2; 6	6; 2
2	(Venezuela) (Bolivia)	Román Recarte; Mauricio Estívariz	6; 4	4; 6	6; 2	0; 6	6; 3
3	(Venezuela) (Bolivia)	Luis David Martínez / Yohny Romero; Mauricio Doria-Medina / Federico Zeballos	6; 3	6; 3	6; 4
4	(Venezuela) (Bolivia)	Luis David Martínez; Mauricio Doria-Medina	7; 5	4; 6	4; 6
5	(Venezuela) (Bolivia)	Piero Luisi; Marco Antonio Rojas	6^{7} 7^{9}	6; 2	6; 3

=== Paraguay vs. Netherlands Antilles ===
Paraguay
4
Yacht y Golf Club Paraguayo, Lambaré, Paraguay
5–7 March 2010
Clay

Netherlands Antilles
1

			1	2	3	4	5
1	(Paraguay) (Netherlands Antilles)	Diego Galeano; Alexander Blom	6; 2	6; 3	4; 6	6; 2
2	(Paraguay) (Netherlands Antilles)	Ramón Delgado; Martijn van Haasteren	6; 1	6; 2	6; 1
3	(Paraguay) (Netherlands Antilles)	Paulo Carvallo / Ramón Delgado; Alexander Blom / Martijn van Haasteren	6; 3	7; 5	6; 1
4	(Paraguay) (Netherlands Antilles)	Paulo Carvallo; Alexander Blom	3; 6	6; 3	4; 6
5	(Paraguay) (Netherlands Antilles)	Nicolás Salama; Claudio Dias Conduto	6; 4	6; 1

=== Mexico vs. Guatemala ===
Mexico
5
Rafael "Pelon" Osuna, Mexico City, Mexico
5–7 March 2010
Clay

Guatemala
0

			1	2	3	4	5
1	(Mexico) (Guatemala)	Bruno Rodríguez; Julen Urigüen	6; 4	6; 0	2; 0
2	(Mexico) (Guatemala)	César Ramírez; Christopher Díaz Figueroa	6; 1	6; 3	6; 1
3	(Mexico) (Guatemala)	Luis Díaz Barriga / Daniel Garza; Manuel Chávez / Christopher Díaz Figueroa	7; 5	6; 3	7; 5
4	(Mexico) (Guatemala)	Bruno Rodríguez; Christopher Díaz Figueroa	4; 6	6; 4	7; 5
5	(Mexico) (Guatemala)	César Ramírez; Wilfredo González	6; 1	6; 0

== Second round ==
=== Venezuela vs. Peru ===
Venezuela
3
Complejo de Tenis Vereda del Lago, Maracaibo, Venezuela
9–11 July
Hard (outdoors)

Peru
1

			1	2	3	4	5
1	(Venezuela) (Peru)	David Souto; Mauricio Echazú	6; 2	6; 4	7; 5
2	(Venezuela) (Peru)	Román Recarte; Iván Miranda	6; 1	3; 6	3; 6			retired
3	(Venezuela) (Peru)	José de Armas / Piero Luisi; Duilio Beretta / Sergio Galdós	7^{8} 6^{6}	7; 5	6; 4
4	(Venezuela) (Peru)	David Souto; Iván Miranda	5; 7	3; 6	6; 2	6; 2	12; 10
5	(Venezuela) (Peru)	Román Recarte; Mauricio Echazú						not played

=== Paraguay vs. Mexico ===
Paraguay
1
Agua Vista Club de Campo Residecial, Encarnación, Paraguay
9–11 July
Clay (outdoors)

Mexico
4

			1	2	3	4	5
1	(Paraguay) (Mexico)	Gustavo Ramírez; Daniel Garza	1; 6	4; 6	2; 6
2	(Paraguay) (Mexico)	Daniel López; César Ramírez	7^{10} 6^{8}	5; 7	6; 4	7^{7} 6^{5}
3	(Paraguay) (Mexico)	Daniel López / Diego Galeano; Miguel Ángel Reyes-Varela / Bruno Rodríguez	1; 6	3; 6	3; 6
4	(Paraguay) (Mexico)	Daniel López; Daniel Garza	2; 6	2; 6	0; 2			retired
5	(Paraguay) (Mexico)	Jose Benitez; César Ramírez	0; 6	6; 4	2; 6

== Play-Offs ==
=== Bolivia vs. El Salvador ===
Bolivia
1
Javier Luizaga, Cochabamba, Bolivia
9–11 July
Clay (outdoors)

El Salvador
4

			1	2	3	4	5
1	(Bolivia) (El Salvador)	Mauricio Estívariz; Rafael Arévalo	4; 6	6; 1	6; 4	6^{6} 7^{8}	6; 8
2	(Bolivia) (El Salvador)	Mauricio Doria-Medina; Marcelo Arévalo	6^{4} 7^{7}	2; 6	6^{5} 7^{7}
3	(Bolivia) (El Salvador)	Mauricio Doria-Medina / Federico Zeballos; Marcelo Arévalo / Rafael Arévalo	4; 6	4; 6	1; 6
4	(Bolivia) (El Salvador)	Federico Zeballos; Rodrigo Rappaccioli	1; 6	6; 1	6^{3} 7^{7}
5	(Bolivia) (El Salvador)	Sebastián Moreno; Sebastián Moreno	6; 1	7; 5

=== Guatemala vs. Netherlands Antilles ===
Guatemala
2
Federacion Nacional de Tenis, Guatemala City, Guatemala
9–11 July
Hard (outdoors)

Netherlands Antilles
3

			1	2	3	4	5
1	(Guatemala) (Netherlands Antilles)	Christopher Díaz Figueroa; Martijn van Haasteren	3; 6	6^{5} 7^{7}	6; 4	6; 2	2; 6
2	(Guatemala) (Netherlands Antilles)	Julen Urigüen; Alexander Blom	6^{2} 7^{7}	6; 3	3; 6	6; 4	6; 3
3	(Guatemala) (Netherlands Antilles)	Manuel Chávez / Sebastien Vidal; Alexander Blom / Martijn van Haasteren	6^{7} 7^{9}	6^{3} 7^{7}	3; 6
4	(Guatemala) (Netherlands Antilles)	Christopher Díaz Figueroa; Alexander Blom	6^{5} 7^{7}	6; 3	3; 6	4; 6
5	(Guatemala) (Netherlands Antilles)	Sebastien Vidal; Gino Meeuwsen	6; 3	6; 3

== Third round ==
=== Venezuela vs. Mexico ===
Venezuela
1
Rafael El Pelon Osuna, Miguel Hidalgo, D.F., Mexico
17–19 September 2010
Clay

Mexico
4

			1	2	3	4	5
1	(Venezuela) (Mexico)	Román Recarte; Daniel Garza	2; 6	2; 6	2; 6
2	(Venezuela) (Mexico)	José de Armas; César Ramírez	1; 6	3; 6	3; 6
3	(Venezuela) (Mexico)	José de Armas / Piero Luisi; Miguel Ángel Reyes Varela / Bruno Rodríguez	6^{2} 7^{7}	3; 6	2; 6
4	(Venezuela) (Mexico)	Luis David Martínez; Daniel Garza	4; 6	1; 6
5	(Venezuela) (Mexico)	Piero Luisi; César Ramírez	6; 4	6; 4
