= Édgar Perea =

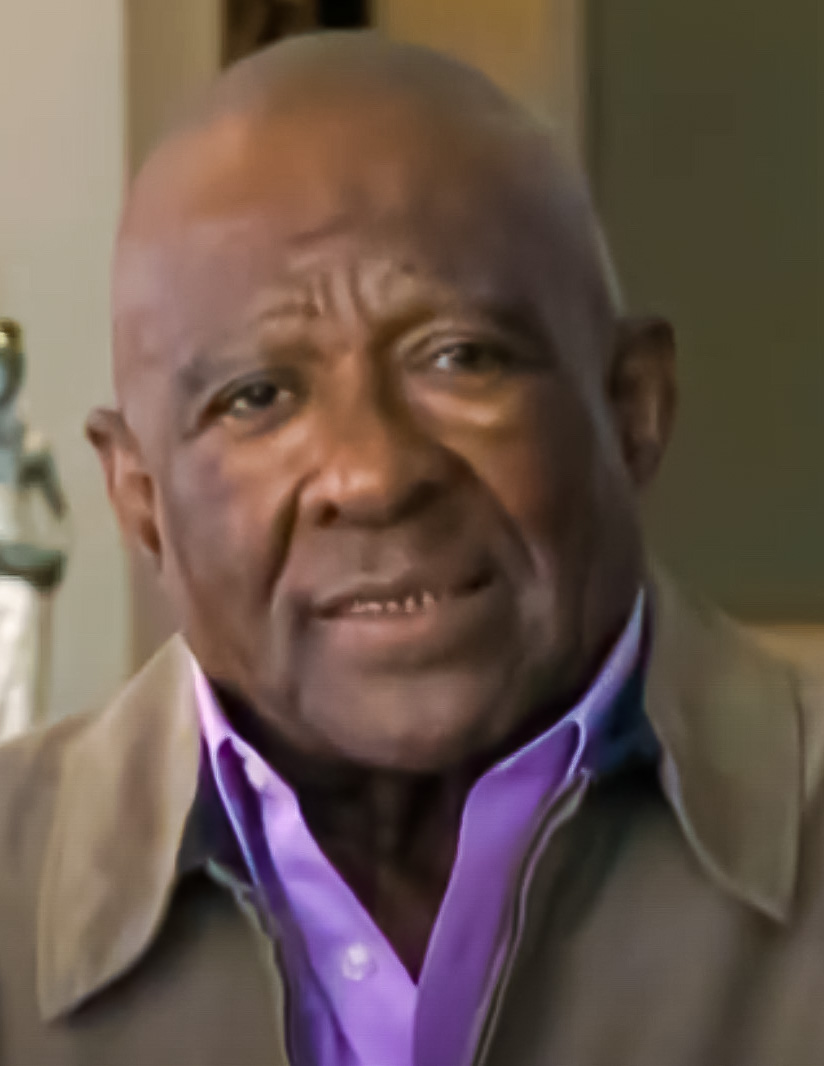

Colombia Ambassador to South Africa
- In office 26 February 2009 – 11 April 2016
- President: Álvaro Uribe Vélez
- Preceded by: Carlos Moreno de Caro

Colombia Ambassador to Mozambique
- In office 26 August 2009 – 11 April 2016
- President: Álvaro Uribe Vélez
- Preceded by: Carlos Moreno de Caro

Colombia Ambassador to Botswana
- In office 14 September 2010 – 11 April 2016
- President: Álvaro Uribe Vélez
- Preceded by: Carlos Moreno de Caro

Senator of Colombia
- In office 20 July 1998 – 18 July 2000

Personal details
- Born: Édgar José Perea Arias; 2 June 1934 Condoto, Chocó, Colombia
- Died: 11 April 2016 (aged 81) Bogotá, Colombia
- Party: Liberal
- Occupation: Sports commentator

Édgar José Perea Arias (2 June 1934 – 11 April 2016) was a Colombian politician and football radio and television commentator. In a country where soccer is the national pastime, Perea was considered one of Colombia's greatest sportscasters. He was known in Colombia for his thunderous voice and for the way he intoned the traditional Spanish-style "Goooooooool!" sound when a goal had been scored. Perea commentated on eight football World Cups, fifteen World Series for CBS Spanish Radio, seven Olympics, many boxing matches and thousands of soccer matches in Colombia and abroad. He became so successful as a sportscaster that he transcended himself into a national politician. Perea was Afro-Colombian and broke down many barriers that kept black Colombians from gaining admiration and respect in Colombian pop culture and in entering the ritzy social scenes of Colombian society. After gaining popularity for his picturesque way of narrating football matches, Perea joined the Colombian Liberal Party with the support of then presidential candidate Horacio Serpa and ran for the senate. In 2009 he was appointed Ambassador to Colombia in South Africa.

== Commentating career ==
Perea was born on 2 June 1934 in Condoto in the department of Chocó on Colombia's Pacific coast, an area largely inhabited by descendants of African slaves who arrived in Colombia in the 18th century. Before the age of ten, his family moved to Cartagena where Perea grew up playing soccer and listening to the radio. Perea began doing play-by-play in the early 1960s and quickly rose to become the voice of Junior, the professional soccer team from the port city of Barranquilla. Throughout the 1970s and 1980s Perea's emotional and passionate manner of broadcasting soccer, baseball and boxing captured the attention of millions of listeners around the country and media executives in Colombia's capital, Bogota. He became regarded as Colombia's best play-by-play announcer. In the early 1990s, he accepted an offer to leave Barranquilla to become the voice of Millonarios, a professional soccer team in Bogota. Perea also accepted the job as sports anchor on a highly rated nightly television news station on national Colombian television, and he also aired a daily radio show that was tops in the market. Exposure to the larger market helped Perea's ratings increase and he became more popular and was listened to by more Colombians.

== Political career ==
=== Senate (1998–2000) ===
Because of Perea's ratings and popularity, politicians and celebrities sometimes appeared with him in the radio booth to play to the emotions of Perea's listeners. In 1997, while President Ernesto Samper was struggling with a scandal concerning allegations he had accepted drug money into his campaign, Samper visited Perea during a soccer match. Perea interviewed the President in the broadcast booth and declared his support for the President's Liberal Party government and for Samper's Chief of Staff, Horacio Serpa who was the alleged successor to the presidency in the upcoming presidential election. Perea continued to use his influence on the public airwaves to endorse the Liberal government and Serpa, and to urge his listeners to do the same. Shortly thereafter, Perea decided to enter politics himself.

Perea ran for senate in 1998 and won by 71,510 votes taking office on 20 July 1998. Perea supported Serpa for president, but Andres Pastrana won the election. Perea had hoped to legislate from the Senate during a Serpa-led presidency but found himself fending off criticism and pressure from President Pastrana's Conservative Party supporters in the Senate. Perea was suspended and subsequently expelled from the Senate on 18 July 2000 for appearing on television and radio broadcasting soccer matches. Perea believed that since he was a sports announcer by trade, he should be allowed to do play-by-play and that he was not doing anything illegal. The rules however made it clear that a senator was not permitted to appear on television or radio and engage in broadcasts. Perea fought the charges against him and eventually was cleared of any corruption and was permitted to return to politics.

=== Campaigns for Mayor of Barranquilla (2003–2007) ===
In 2003 Perea ran unsuccessfully for Mayor of Barranquilla. In 2007 Perea decided to run once again for mayor of Barranquilla against Alejandro Char Chaljub. Perea facing a possible low turnout in poll results decided to ally with one of Char's supporters and political barons of the region José Name Tehran, a move that was highly criticized by the media.. Perea once again lost the election.

=== Ambassador to South Africa (2009–2016) ===
President Álvaro Uribe Vélez appointed Perea Ambassador of Colombia to South Africa in replacement of Carlos Moreno de Caro. Perea presented his diplomatic credentials to President Thabo Mbeki on 26 February 2009. Perea's experience as a soccer commentator and knowledge of the game ahead of the 2010 FIFA World Cup and knowledge influenced President Uribe to appoint Perea to the diplomatic post.

== Death ==
Perea died in a hospital in the north of Bogotá on 11 April 2016.
