= Let the Moreno Play Movement =

Political party in Colombia

The Let the Moreno Play Movement (Movimiento Dejen Jugar al Moreno) was a political party in Colombia founded by Carlos Moreno de Caro. In the 2002 legislative elections, the party won, as one of the many small parties, parliamentary representation. In the election of 2006, the party won no seats.
