= Moreni (surname) =

Moreni is a surname. Notable people with the surname include:

- Cristian Moreni (born 1972), Italian former road racing cyclist
- Gian Vincenzo Moreni (1932 – 1999), Italian prelate of the Catholic Church
- Mattia Bruno Moreni (1920–1999), Italian sculptor and painter.

== See also ==
- Moreno (surname)
- Moreni (disambiguation)
