= Francisco Moreno Fernández (linguist) =

Spanish academic

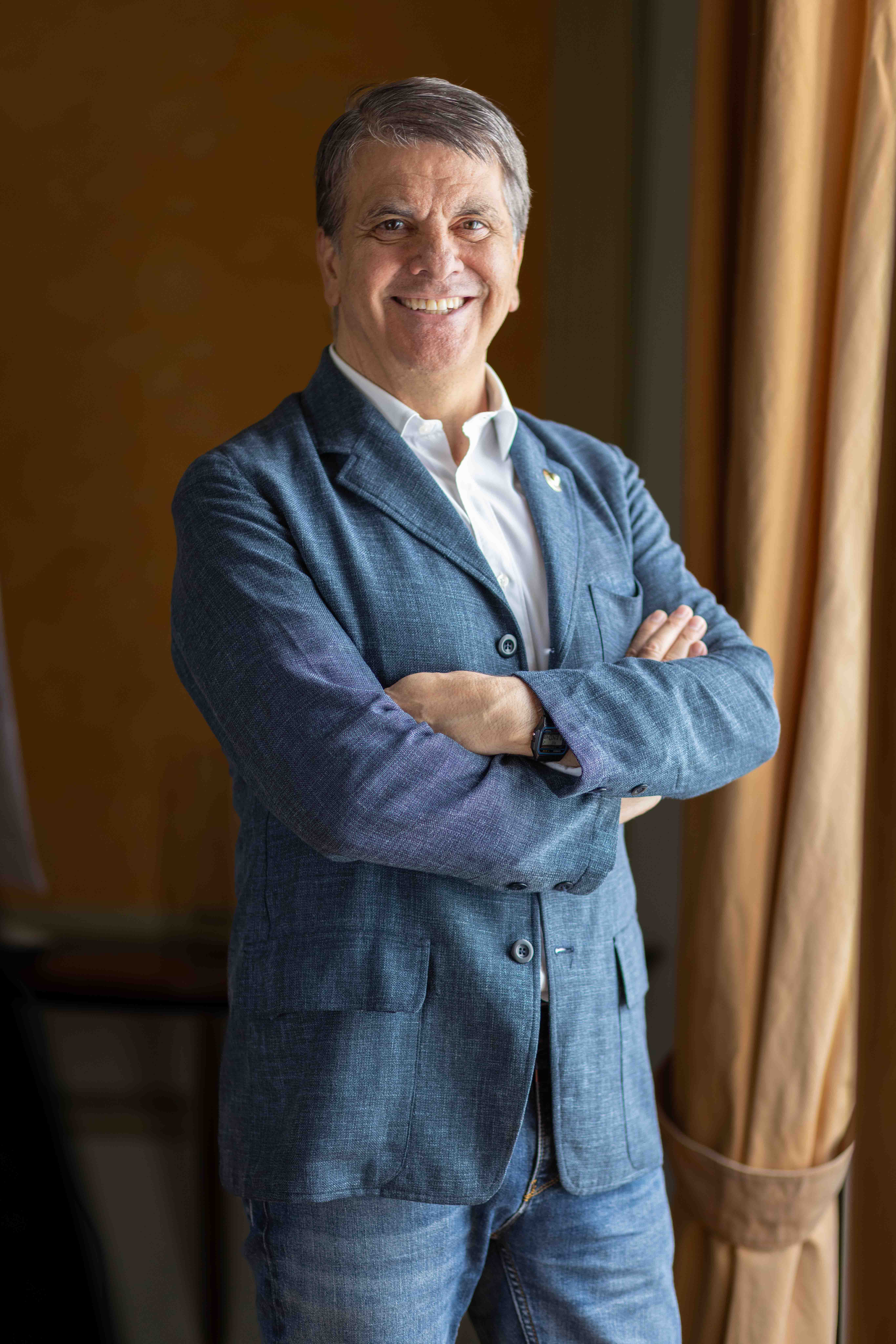
Francisco Moreno Fernández

Francisco Moreno Fernández (Note: In this Spanish name, the first or paternal surname is Moreno and the second or maternal family name is Fernández.) (born 1960) is a Spanish dialectologist and sociolinguist.

== Career ==
Born in Mota del Cuervo, Castilla–La Mancha, Moreno Fernández holds a PhD in Hispanic Linguistics, is honorary professor of Spanish Language at the University of Alcalá (Spain), Alexander von Humboldt professor at Heidelberg University and director of the Observatorio Global del Español at the Instituto Cervantes. Since acceptance of this professorship awarded by the Alexander von Humboldt Foundation and endowed by the Federal Ministry of Education and Research he is directing the Heidelberg Center for Ibero-American Studies (HCIAS). He pursues research in sociolinguistics, dialectology, and applied linguistics. He has been academic director of the Instituto Cervantes (2008-2013) and a visiting researcher at the universities of London, New York, (SUNY – Albany), Québec (Montreal), and Tokyo as well as visiting professor at University of Gothenburg (Sweden), Universidade de São Paulo (Brazil), University of Illinois at Chicago (U.S.), Brigham Young University (U.S.),Pontificia Universidad Católica de Chile, and Universidad NAcional de Córdoba, Argentina.

He is a full member of the North American Academy of the Spanish Language (since 2017) and of the Academia Europaea (since 2022), and a corresponding member of the Cuban Academy of the Language (since 2013), the Spanish Royal Academy (since 2015), the Chilean Academy of the Language (since 2017), the Mexican Academy of Language (since 2018), and the Panamanian Academy of Language (since 2025).

Moreno Fernández was director of the Cervantes institutes at São Paulo (1998–2001) and Chicago (2001–2005). He was academic and research director of the Comillas Foundation for the study and teaching of Spanish language and culture (2006–2008) and director of the Instituto Cervantes at Harvard University (Observatory of the Spanish Language and Hispanic Cultures in the United States) (2013-2018).

In 1998, he coordinated the first Cervantes Institute Yearbook. Spanish in the World. He has been a columnist in several American journals in Spanish: La Opinión (Los Angeles), El Diario La Prensa (New York), and La Raza (Chicago) and co-editor of the journals Spanish in Context (John Benjamins) and Journal of Linguistic Geography (Cambridge University Press). He was founder and first general editor of the journal Lengua y migración / Language & Migration. He belongs to the editorial board of the journals: International Journal of the Sociology of Language, Journal of World Languages, Boletín de Filología de la Universidad de Chile, Lingüística Española Actual, Revista Internacional de Lingüística Iberoamericana, and Oralia.

== Publications ==
- Brasil como territorio hispanohablantes and Héctor Álvarez Mella, Observatorio Global del Español, DOGE-004/082026, Alcalá de Henares, Instituto Cervantes, 2026, ISBN 979-13-87679-21-7.
- Así nos comunicamos en sociedad, Lingüística y Comunicación, Ediciones Complutense, Madrid 2024, ISBN 9788466938488.
- Language Demography, Routledge (in collaboration with Héctor Álvarez Mella), London and New York 2024, ISBN 978-1-032-35538-2.
- Demografía de las lenguas, Lengua y Sociedad en el Mundo Hispánico, 53, Iberoamericana Vervuert (in collaboration with Héctor Álvarez Mella), Madrid 2024, ISBN 978-84-9192-419-7.
- El español en Europa. Archiletras Cientíca. Revista de investigación de lengua y letras (ACRILL), Vol. 10, Prensa y Servicios de la Lengua (with Héctor Álvarez Mella, eds.), Madrid 2023, ISBN 978-84-09-56528-3.
- Monográfico: Patrones sociolingüísticos y geolectales del español. Estudios sobre el corpus PRESEEA, Vol. 94: Círculo de Lingüística Aplicada a la Comunicación (with Ana M. Cestero Mancera, eds.), Madrid: Ediciones Complutense, 2023, ISSNe: 1576–4737.
- La lengua de los hispanos unidos de América: Crónica de resistencia, Colección Eleanor Roosevelt, Madrid: Catarata, 2022, ISBN 978-84-1352-584-6.
- Dialectología hispánica/ The Routledge Handbook of Spanish Dialectology (with Rocío Caravedo, eds.), 1st. ed., London: Routledge, 2022, 642 pp. ISBN 9780367266288.
- El Español en Europa. Sumplemento 1.1. El Español en la Alemania Precovid-19 (with Óscar Loureda Lamas, Héctor Álvarez Mella and David Scheffler), Madrid: Instituto Cervantes.
- El español en Europa. Demolingüística del español en Alemania (with Óscar Loureda Lamas, Héctor Álvarez Mella and David Scheffler), Madrid: Instituto Cervantes, 2021, ISBN 978-84-18210-06-8.
- "Yo-Yo Boing! Or Literature as a Translingual Practice" in Poets, Philosophers: On the Writings of Giannina Braschi. Frederick Luis Aldama, ed. Pittsburgh, University of Pittsburgh Press. (2020) ISBN 9780822946182.
- El español lengua migratoria, Vol. Monográfico Archiletras Científica, II (2020). ISSN 2659-8957.
- Gramática fundamental del español (2020) (with Inmaculada Penadés Martínez and Clara Ureña Tormo). London, Routledge. ISBN 9781138359611.
- Variedades de la lengua española (2020). London, Routledge. ISBN 9781138385955.
- Tras Babel. De la naturaleza social del lenguaje (2018). Oviedo: Ediciones Nobel. ISBN 9788484597506.
- Diccionario de anglicismos del español estadounidense (2018). Cambridge, MA: Instituto Cervantes at Harvard. ISBN 978-0-692-04726-2.
- A Framework for Cognitive Sociolinguistics (2016). London: Routledge. ISBN 978-1138-68198-9.
- La maravillosa historia del español (2015). Madrid: Espasa. ISBN 978-84-670-4427-0.
- Spanish Revolution. Ensayo sobre los lenguajes indignados (2014). Valencia: Unoycero. ISBN 978-84-942609-3-3.
- Las lenguas de España a debate (2013) (with. F. Ramallo). Valencia: Unoycero. ISBN 978-84-941776-6-8.
- Sociolingüística cognitiva (2012). Madrid / Frankfurt: Iberoamericana / Vervuert. ISBN 978-84-8489-693-7 (Iberoamericana) / 978-3-86527-742-8 (Vervuert).
- Las variedades de la lengua española y su enseñanza (2010). Madrid: Arco/Libros. ISBN 978-84-7635-802-3.
- La lengua española en su geografía. Manual de dialectología hispánica (2009; updated 2nd. ed., 2014). Madrid: Arco/Libros. ISBN 978-84-7635-783-5.
- Atlas de la lengua española en el mundo (2008) (with J. Otero). Barcelona: Ariel. ISBN 978-84-08-07800-5. (3rd. ed. updated, 2017. ISBN 978-84-08-16664-1).
- (ed.) Sociolinguistics of Spanish in Spain: the bilingual areas (2007). International Journal of the Sociology of Language. ISSN (Online): 1613–3668. ISSN (Print) 0165–2516.
- Demografía de la lengua española (2007) (with J. Otero). Madrid: Fundación Telefónica - Instituto Complutense de Estudios Internacionales. ISBN 978-84-611-5071-7.
- Principios de Sociolingüística y Sociología del Lenguaje. (1998; 2nd.ed, 2005; 3rd ed., 2008). Barcelona: Ariel. ISBN 978-84-344-8264-7.
- Historia social de las lenguas de España (2005). Barcelona: Ariel. ISBN 978-84-344-8263-0
- La lengua hablada en Alcalá de Henares (2004–2007) (with A. Cestero, I. Molina and F. Paredes). Alcalá de Henares: Universidad de Alcalá. ISBN 978-84-8138-535-9
- Diccionario bilingüe de uso Español – Portugués / Portugués- Español (2003; 2nd.ed, 2005). Madrid: Arco/Libros. ISBN 978-84-7635-545-9.
- Producción, expresión e interacción oral (2002). Madrid: Arco/Libros. ISBN 978-84-7635-487-2.
- Qué español enseñar (2000; 2nd.ed, 2007). Madrid: Arco/Libros. ISBN 978-84-7635-447-6.
- (dir.) Diccionario para la Enseñanza de la Lengua Española (1995). Barcelona: Biblograf. ISBN 84-8332-111-4.
- La división dialectal del español de América (1993). Alcalá de Henares: Universidad de Alcalá. ISBN 84-86981-83-2.
- (ed.) Sociolinguistics and Stylistic Variation (1992). Lynx. ISSN 0214-4611.
- Metodología sociolingüística (1990). Madrid: Gredos. ISBN 978-84-249-1433-2.

== Awards and distinctions ==
- Voto de Louvor da Universidade Federal do Rio de Janeiro (2000)
- "National Association of Hispanic Publications". First Place. Multiple Article Series, Larger Publications (Las Vegas, USA; March 2003)
- XV "Juan Martín de Nicolás" Research Award (2006)
- National Essay Prize Finalist. Spain (2016)
- Honorary Doctor Universidad Ricardo Palma (Peru) (2017)
- "Rey de España" Award of Journalism XV Premio Don Quijote (Spain) (2018)
- Instituto Cervantes Medal (2019)
- International Award Winner - Alexander von Humboldt Foundation (2020)
- Gold Insignia - Universidad de Alcalá (2022)
- Distinguished Professor Universidad Nacional de Córdoba, Argentina (2026)
