= 1955 Campeonato Nacional Primera División =

Campeonato Nacional de Fútbol Profesional
- Dates: 7 May 1956 – 21 December 1956
- Champions: Palestino (1st title)
- Relegated: Universidad Católica
- Matches: 225
- Goals: 815 (3.62 per match)
- Top goalscorer: Nicolás Moreno (27 goals)
- Biggest away win: Ferrobádminton 3–9 Palestino (1 November)
- Highest attendance: 42,843 Audax Italiano 1–0 Colo-Colo (12 June)
- Total attendance: 1,821,503
- Average attendance: 8,095

The 1955 Campeonato Nacional de Fútbol Profesional, was the 23rd season of top-flight football in Chile. Palestino was the tournament’s champion, winning its first ever title.

== First stage ==
=== Scores ===
| | AUD | COL | EVE | FEB | GCR | MAG | OHI | PAL | RAN | SMO | UES | UCA | UCH | SWA |
|---|---|---|---|---|---|---|---|---|---|---|---|---|---|---|
| Audax | | 1–0 | 2–2 | 3–2 | 3–3 | 0–0 | 4–3 | 0–4 | 2–2 | 1–1 | 1–2 | 2–1 | 1–1 | 4–2 |
| Colo-Colo | 2–1 | | 0–0 | 1–3 | 1–1 | 2–1 | 2–1 | 2–0 | 5–1 | 4–2 | 1–1 | 2–1 | 1–1 | 3–1 |
| Everton | 2–0 | 4–3 | | 2–1 | 4–1 | 2–0 | 2–0 | 0–0 | 1–0 | 0–0 | 2–1 | 1–0 | 0–4 | 1–1 |
| Ferrobádminton | 2–2 | 1–2 | 3–3 | | 0–2 | 3–4 | 0–1 | 3–9 | 1–3 | 2–2 | 1–1 | 3–3 | 2–2 | 2–1 |
| Green Cross | 0–2 | 1–1 | 1–1 | 3–3 | | 1–1 | 6–1 | 1–2 | 5–1 | 2–0 | 1–1 | 3–2 | 1–0 | 2–1 |
| Magallanes | 3–1 | 2–2 | 4–3 | 2–0 | 3–1 | | 3–3 | 2–3 | 0–1 | 1–0 | 1–2 | 2–0 | 2–2 | 2–1 |
| O'Higgins | 3–3 | 3–1 | 3–2 | 3–2 | 1–1 | 3–3 | | 2–2 | 4–2 | 2–0 | 3–1 | 0–0 | 0–1 | 1–1 |
| Palestino | 3–3 | 3–2 | 2–1 | 1–1 | 2–1 | 2–0 | 4–2 | | 5–3 | 3–0 | 1–1 | 5–3 | 2–4 | 3–1 |
| Rangers | 2–2 | 2–2 | 2–0 | 1–1 | 1–1 | 1–1 | 1–1 | 0–0 | | 3–0 | 1–3 | 0–1 | 4–1 | 0–0 |
| S. Morning | 1–1 | 2–1 | 2–2 | 1–3 | 2–0 | 4–3 | 2–0 | 1–1 | 2–1 | | 0–1 | 0–0 | 0–3 | 1–2 |
| U. Española | 3–3 | 1–0 | 1–4 | 1–1 | 0–1 | 3–0 | 2–0 | 2–6 | 1–1 | 2–0 | | 2–3 | 4–2 | 4–0 |
| U. Católica | 4–5 | 1–6 | 1–0 | 5–3 | 1–3 | 2–3 | 0–1 | 1–2 | 3–0 | 0–2 | 2–0 | | 1–3 | 1–3 |
| U. de Chile | 3–5 | 2–2 | 1–0 | 0–2 | 3–0 | 2–3 | 7–2 | 1–2 | 3–3 | 3–1 | 0–0 | 0–1 | | 6–1 |
| S. Wanderers | 3–2 | 2–1 | 1–1 | 1–1 | 4–3 | 3–0 | 1–2 | 2–2 | 0–0 | 4–1 | 1–2 | 1–1 | 2–2 | |

=== Standings ===
| Pos | Team | Pld | W | D | L | GF | GA | GD | Pts | Qualification or relegation |
|---|---|---|---|---|---|---|---|---|---|---|
| 1 | Palestino | 26 | 16 | 8 | 2 | 69 | 39 | +30 | 40 | Qualified to the Championship stage |
| 2 | Unión Española | 26 | 11 | 8 | 7 | 42 | 36 | +6 | 30 | Qualified to the Championship stage |
| 3 | Everton | 26 | 10 | 9 | 7 | 40 | 34 | +6 | 29 | Qualified to the Championship stage |
| 4 | Universidad de Chile | 26 | 10 | 8 | 8 | 57 | 42 | +15 | 28 | Qualified to the Championship stage |
| 5 | Colo-Colo | 26 | 10 | 8 | 8 | 49 | 39 | +10 | 28 | Qualified to the Championship stage |
| 6 | Audax Italiano | 26 | 8 | 12 | 6 | 54 | 54 | 0 | 28 | Qualified to the Championship stage |
| 7 | Green Cross | 26 | 9 | 9 | 8 | 45 | 41 | +4 | 27 | Qualified to the Championship stage |
| 8 | Magallanes | 26 | 10 | 7 | 9 | 46 | 47 | −1 | 27 | Qualified to the Championship stage |
| 9 | O'Higgins | 26 | 9 | 8 | 9 | 45 | 53 | −8 | 26 | |
| 10 | Santiago Wanderers | 26 | 7 | 9 | 10 | 40 | 48 | −8 | 23 | |
| 11 | Rangers | 26 | 5 | 12 | 9 | 36 | 45 | −9 | 22 | |
| 12 | Ferrobádminton | 26 | 4 | 11 | 11 | 46 | 59 | −13 | 19 | |
| 13 | Santiago Morning | 26 | 6 | 7 | 13 | 27 | 45 | −18 | 19 | |
| 14 | Universidad Católica | 26 | 7 | 4 | 15 | 38 | 52 | −14 | 18 | |

== Championship stage ==
=== Scores ===
| | AUD | COL | EVE | GCR | MAG | PAL | UES | UCH |
|---|---|---|---|---|---|---|---|---|
| Audax | | 1–4 | 4–2 | 1–1 | 1–1 | 3–5 | 1–1 | 1–2 |
| Colo-Colo | | | 2–6 | 1–3 | 2–2 | 6–2 | 3–1 | 5–1 |
| Everton | | | | 2–2 | 1–0 | 2–3 | 1–1 | 5–2 |
| Green Cross | | | | | 2–1 | 5–3 | 0–1 | 0–3 |
| Magallanes | | | | | | 4–3 | 2–0 | 2–2 |
| Palestino | | | | | | | 2–1 | 4–5 |
| U. Española | | | | | | | | 0–4 |
| U. de Chile | | | | | | | | |

=== Standings ===
| Pos | Team | Pld | W | D | L | GF | GA | GD | Pts |
|---|---|---|---|---|---|---|---|---|---|
| 1 | Colo-Colo | 7 | 4 | 1 | 2 | 23 | 16 | +7 | 9 |
| 2 | Universidad de Chile | 7 | 4 | 1 | 2 | 19 | 17 | +2 | 9 |
| 3 | Everton | 7 | 3 | 2 | 2 | 19 | 14 | +5 | 8 |
| 4 | Green Cross | 7 | 3 | 2 | 2 | 13 | 12 | +1 | 8 |
| 5 | Magallanes | 7 | 2 | 3 | 2 | 12 | 11 | +1 | 7 |
| 6 | Palestino | 7 | 3 | 0 | 4 | 22 | 26 | −4 | 6 |
| 7 | Audax Italiano | 7 | 1 | 3 | 3 | 12 | 16 | −4 | 5 |
| 8 | Unión Española | 7 | 1 | 2 | 4 | 5 | 13 | −8 | 4 |

=== Aggregate table ===
| Pos | Team | Pld | W | D | L | GF | GA | GD | Pts | Qualification |
|---|---|---|---|---|---|---|---|---|---|---|
| 1 | Palestino | 33 | 19 | 8 | 6 | 91 | 65 | +26 | 46 | Champions |
| 2 | Colo-Colo | 33 | 14 | 9 | 10 | 72 | 55 | +17 | 37 | |
| 3 | Universidad de Chile | 33 | 14 | 9 | 10 | 76 | 59 | +17 | 37 | |
| 4 | Everton | 33 | 13 | 11 | 9 | 59 | 48 | +11 | 37 | |
| 5 | Green Cross | 33 | 12 | 11 | 10 | 58 | 53 | +5 | 35 | |
| 6 | Magallanes | 33 | 12 | 10 | 11 | 58 | 58 | 0 | 34 | |
| 7 | Unión Española | 33 | 12 | 10 | 11 | 47 | 49 | −2 | 34 | |
| 8 | Audax Italiano | 33 | 9 | 15 | 9 | 66 | 70 | −4 | 33 | |

Campeonato Nacional
1955 champions

1st title

== Relegation stage ==
=== Scores ===
| | FEB | OHI | RAN | SMO | UCA | SWA |
|---|---|---|---|---|---|---|
| Ferrobádminton | | 1–1 | 2–0 | 0–1 | 4–4 | 0–4 |
| O'Higgins | | | 1–5 | 5–2 | 3–2 | 2–1 |
| Rangers | | | | 1–3 | 1–0 | 1–1 |
| S. Morning | | | | | 3–1 | 1–1 |
| U. Católica | | | | | | 4–1 |
| S. Wanderers | | | | | | |

=== Standings ===
| Pos | Team | GP | W | D | L | GF | GA | GD | Pts |
|---|---|---|---|---|---|---|---|---|---|
| 1 | Santiago Morning | 5 | 3 | 1 | 1 | 10 | 8 | 2 | 7 |
| 1 | O'Higgins | 5 | 3 | 1 | 1 | 12 | 11 | 1 | 7 |
| 3 | Rangers | 5 | 2 | 1 | 2 | 8 | 7 | 1 | 5 |
| 4 | Santiago Wanderers | 5 | 1 | 2 | 2 | 8 | 8 | 0 | 4 |
| 5 | Ferrobádminton | 5 | 1 | 2 | 2 | 7 | 10 | -3 | 4 |
| 6 | Universidad Católica | 5 | 1 | 1 | 3 | 11 | 12 | -1 | 3 |

=== Aggregate table ===
| Pos | Team | GP | W | D | L | GF | GA | GD | Pts |
|---|---|---|---|---|---|---|---|---|---|
| 9 | O'Higgins | 31 | 12 | 9 | 10 | 57 | 64 | -7 | 33 |
| 10 | Santiago Wanderers | 31 | 8 | 11 | 12 | 48 | 56 | -8 | 27 |
| 11 | Rangers | 31 | 7 | 13 | 11 | 44 | 52 | -8 | 27 |
| 12 | Santiago Morning | 31 | 9 | 8 | 14 | 37 | 53 | -16 | 26 |
| 13 | Ferrobádminton | 31 | 5 | 13 | 13 | 53 | 69 | -16 | 23 |
| 14 | Universidad Católica | 31 | 8 | 5 | 18 | 49 | 64 | -15 | 21 |

| Relegated to Segunda División |

== Topscorer ==
| Name | Team | Goals |
|---|---|---|
| (Argentina) Nicolás Moreno | Green Cross | 27 |
