= Moreni oil field =

Oil field in Moreni, Dâmbovița County

Moreni
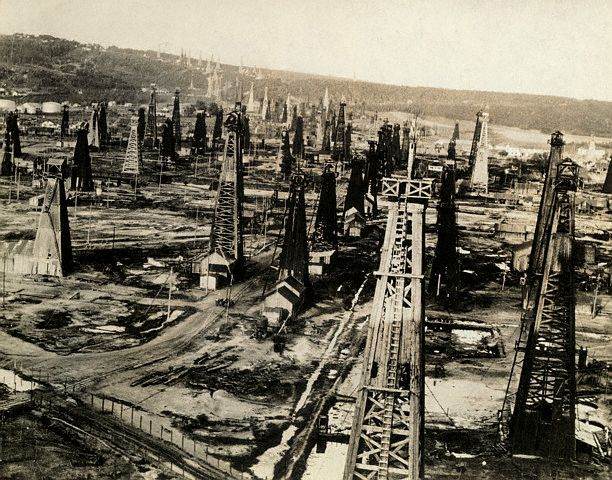
- Country: Romania
- Region: Dâmbovița County
- Offshore/onshore: onshore
- Operator: Petrom

Field history
- Discovery: 1890
- Start of development: 1890
- Start of production: 1900

Production
- Current production of oil: 3,000 barrels per day (~1.5×10^{5} t/a)
- Estimated oil in place: 107 million tonnes (~ 100×10^{6} m^{3} or 800 million bbl)

The Moreni oil field is an oil field located in Moreni, Dâmbovița County. It was discovered in 1890 and developed by Petrom. It began production in 1900 and produces oil. The total proven reserves of the Moreni oil field are around 800 million barrels (107 million tonnes), and production is centered on 3,000 barrels per day (480 m^{3}/d).
