= Miguel Moreno =

Spanish poet and writer

Miguel Moreno (1596–1655) was a Golden Age Spanish poet and writer.
