= Álvaro Raposo de Oliveira =

Peruvian tennis player

- Country (sports): Peru
- Born: 5 September 1990 (age 35) Lima, Peru
- Height: 1.80 m (5 ft 11 in)
- Turned pro: 2007
- Plays: Left-handed
- Prize money: $10,568

Singles
- Career record: 1–0
- Career titles: 0
- Highest ranking: No. 752 (10 May 2010)
- Current ranking: No. 1,780 (20 June 2011)

Grand Slam singles results
- Australian Open: –
- French Open: –
- Wimbledon: –
- US Open: –

Doubles
- Career titles: 0

Álvaro Raposo de Oliveira (born 5 September 1990) is a Peruvian professional tennis player.

Raposo debuted for Peru Davis Cup team in the Davis Cup in 2010 against El Salvador in Lima. He defeated Marcelo Arevalo 6–3, 7–5.
