= Darío Acosta =

Uruguayan tennis player (born 1987)

- Country (sports): Uruguay
- Born: 9 September 1987 (age 37)
- Plays: Right-handed (two-handed backhand)
- Prize money: $3,644

Singles
- Career record: 0–1 (at ATP Tour level, Grand Slam level, and in Davis Cup)
- Career titles: 0
- Highest ranking: No. 1366 (27 July 2009)

Doubles
- Career record: 0–0 (at ATP Tour level, Grand Slam level, and in Davis Cup)
- Career titles: 0
- Highest ranking: No. 1320 (19 October 2009)
- Last updated on: 29 October 2018.

Darío Acosta (born 9 September 1987) is a Uruguayan tennis player.

Acosta has a career high ATP singles ranking of 1366 achieved on 27 July 2009. He also has a career high ATP doubles ranking of 1320 achieved on 19 October 2009.

Acosta represents Uruguay at the Davis Cup, where he has a W/L record of 0–1.
