= Audelino Moreno =

Venezuelan officer and diplomat (1919–2010)

Personal details
- Born: 27 July 1919 Queniquea, Venezuela
- Died: 23 November 2010 (aged 91) Caracas, Venezuela
- Spouse: María Josefina González (m. 1953; died 2008)
- Children: 5

Military service
- Allegiance: Venezuela
- Branch/service: Venezuelan Army
- Years of service: 1936–1971
- Rank: Brigadier general

Audelino Moreno (27 July 1919 – 23 November 2010) was a Venezuelan officer and diplomat. He held numerous positions in the Venezuelan Army and diplomatic service.

== Life ==
Moreno joined the Venezuelan army in June 1936 as a member of the cavalry. He was promoted to corporal in 1938, lieutenant in 1946, colonel in 1960 and then brigadier general in 1964. In 1943, he was falsely accused of being a communist-sympathiser and was sent to serve at the San Carlos de la Barra Fortress, though he appealed to president of Venezuela, Isaías Medina Angarita, he remained at the fort until the 1945 Venezuelan coup d'état.

He was the commander of the federal district police and inspector general of the army. He also served as both the Venezuelan ambassador to the Dominican Republic and Nicaragua. Moreno married María Josefina González in 1953 and they had five children together. He retired in 1971 and died on 23 November 2010, aged 91.

== Honours ==
- Venezuela:
  - Order of the Liberator
  - Cross of the Venezuelan Land Forces, Second Class
  - Cross of the Venezuelan Air Forces, Third Class
