= Sebastián Moreno =

Salvadoran tennis player

- Country (sports): El Salvador
- Born: 6 February 1992 (age 33); El Salvador
- Plays: Right-handed, two-handed backhand
- Prize money: $0

Singles
- Career record: 0–2 (at ATP Tour level, Grand Slam level, and in Davis Cup)
- Career titles: 0

Doubles
- Career record: 0–0 (at ATP Tour level, Grand Slam level, and in Davis Cup)
- Career titles: 0
- Last updated on: 31 January 2021.

Sebastián Moreno (born 6 February 1992) is a Salvadoran tennis player.

Moreno has a career-high ITF juniors ranking of 393, achieved on 26 July 2010.

Moreno represented El Salvador at the 2010 Davis Cup, where he has a W/L record of 0–2.

== Davis Cup ==
=== Participations: (0–2) ===
Group membership World Group (0–0) WG Play-off (0–0) Group I (0–0) Group II (0–2) Group III (0–0) Group IV (0–0)	Matches by surface Hard (0–0) Clay (0–2) Grass (0–0) Carpet (0–0)	Matches by type Singles (0–2) Doubles (0–0)

- ▲ ▼ indicates the outcome of the Davis Cup match followed by the score, date, place of event, the zonal classification and its phase, and the court surface.
