= Carlos J. Moreno =

Colombian American mathematician

Carlos Julio Moreno is a Colombian mathematician and faculty member at Baruch College and at the Graduate Center of the City University of New York (CUNY).

His B.A. and his Ph.D. in mathematics were earned at New York University. Moreno has over sixty publications, including two books, on topics dealing with algebra and number theory.

== Selected publications ==
- Algebraic curves over finite fields. Cambridge University Press. 1991. ISBN 9780521342520.
- Advanced analytic number theory: L-functions. Mathematical Surveys. Vol. 115. Americal Mathematical Society. 2005. ISBN 9780821842669.
