= Carlos Moreno de Caro =

Colombian diplomat

Carlos Abraham Moreno de Caro
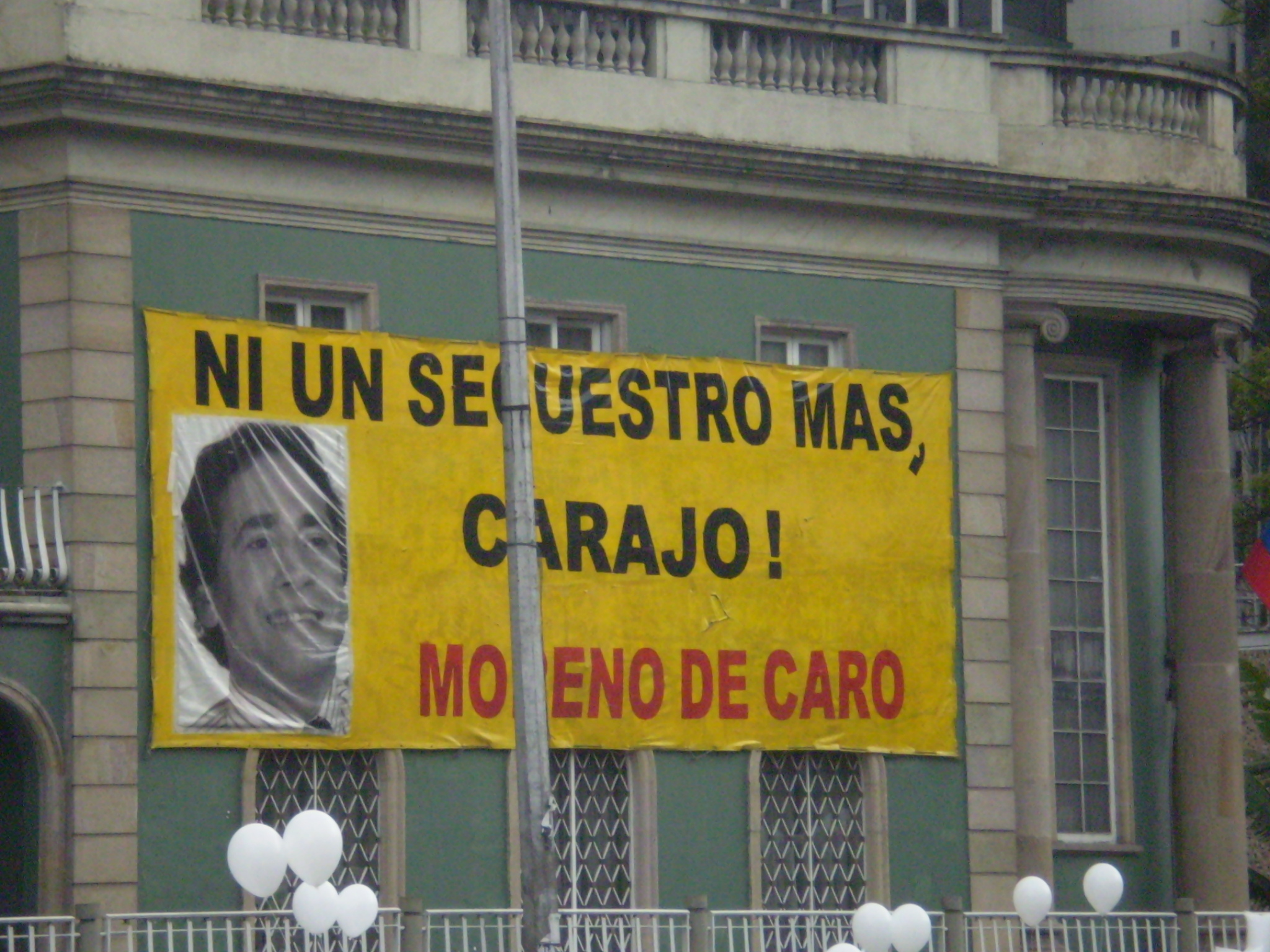

Colombia Ambassador to South Africa
- In office 2007–2008
- President: Álvaro Uribe Vélez
- Preceded by: Víctor G Ricardo Piñeros
- Succeeded by: Edgar J Perea Arias

Personal details
- Born: March 24, 1946 (age 80) Barranquilla, Atlántico, Colombia
- Party: Let the Moreno Play Movement
- Other political affiliations: Conservative
- Education: University of Florida
- Occupation: Politician, educator
- Profession: Engineer

Carlos Moreno de Caro (born March 24, 1946) is a Colombian politician. He is the founder of the Let the Moreno play movement party, and has served as both Member to the Chamber of Representatives and Senate of Colombia, as Ambassador of Colombia to South Africa, and as Councilman of Bogotá.

Moreno is known for his controversial populist political antics at various times in official government events, involving at various times, different types of animals and live music. Moreno popularly refers himself in the third-person as “the Moreno” which in Spanish means “dark-skinned person”, which allows a playful use of his last name to refer to the underdog often discriminated peoples of dark skin as in the case of his political party “Dejen Jugar al Moreno” (“Let the dark-skin fellow play”).

== Ambassadorship ==
In 2006 to the surprise and shock of many Colombians, President Álvaro Uribe Vélez named Moreno de Caro as the new Colombian Ambassador to the Republic of South Africa, replacing the ailing Víctor Guillermo Ricardo Piñeros. While waiting for the South African beneplacito, Moreno de Caro caused controversy accusing the Colombian Chancillery of deliberately delaying his approval to try to sabotage his appointment going so far as storming into the Chancellery getting in trouble with the security personnel and yelling at the Deputy Chancellor Camilo Reyes Rodríguez, who would be his future boss. The incident followed Moreno de Caro's attempt to enlist in his diplomatic entourage a group of unusual diplomats which included former Miss Colombia Vanessa Mendoza, former football stars Faustino Asprilla and Carlos Valderrama, and two demobilized former guerilla members to assist him in his mission abroad, however as Ambassador he would only had the power to appoint two members out of the four-person team he would be assigned, his request was ultimately not approved.

After the heated waiting period, the beneplacito was received by the Chancellery and Moreno de Caro was sworn in by President Uribe as Ambassador to South Africa on February 26, 2007. Following his investiture, he moved to Pretoria where he presented his Letters of Credence to President Thabo Mbeki on May 3, 2007 taking the opportunity to invite President Mbeki to Colombia and assist with the peace talks with the guerrillas.

As ambassador, Moreno de Caro pushed an accelerated agenda of mutual Colombian and South African investment, trade and interest. During his ambassadorship, the South African government expressed interest in implementing a bus rapid transit system modeled after Bogota's TransMilenio in many of its big cities in preparation for the 2010 FIFA World Cup that would be held in that country. For this the South African government subscribed to a cooperation agreement with Colombia in order to exchange experiences and expertise, an agreement that linked the cities of Pretoria, Johannesburg, and Port Elizabeth to Bogotá. The end result of this technological exchange resulted in the creation of the Rea Vaya. In his commitment to social responsibility, Moreno enlisted a group of three South African young men who had been afflicted by drug addiction to a program that included opportunities to work and study to better their lives, and with the aid and assistance of the Colombian embassy were able to rejoin society and establish their own company, for this social labour, the Embassy was awarded a Social Responsibility certificate by Junior Chamber International.

Forceful Moreno insisted in submitting a weekly personal report directly to President Uribe to subdue the animosity and lack of public expectations in his appointment as ambassador. Every Saturday Moreno would call the President to present his accomplishments. Four months in his new job, Moreno once again stirred controversy when he announced that he was resigning from his post, because according to him he had completed “80 percent of the commitments made to the President and the country, and in a few months [I expect] to complete the remaining tasks to return to the country.” In response to the ic public criticism of his actions, the Chancellery informed Moreno that if he insisted in resigning, he would have to pay for his relocation costs and that of his staff and family, for the embassy would not pay for their return given the short time in their posts, this forced Moreno to stay as ambassador in Pretoria vowing his swift return to national politics whenever he had the chance.

Moreno de Caro finally resigned his ambassadorship in 2008 and was replaced by Édgar José Perea Arias.
