= Nicolás Moreno (footballer, born 1928) =

Argentine footballer

Nicolás Moreno (born 4 July 1928, in Buenos Aires, Argentina) is an Argentine former professional footballer who played as a forward for clubs in Argentina, Brazil, and Chile.

== Clubs ==
- Banfield 1944–1952; 1953–1954
- São Paulo 1952–1953
- Green Cross 1955–1957
- Santiago Wanderers 1958–1962

== Honours ==
Banfield

- Primera B Metropolitana: 1946

Santiago Wanderers

- Primera División de Chile: 1958

Individual

- Primera División de Chile top scorer: 1955
