= Nicolás Moreno (footballer, born 1994) =

Argentine professional footballer

Personal information
- Date of birth: 14 January 1994 (age 32)
- Place of birth: Venado Tuerto, Argentina
- Height: 1.79 m (5 ft 10 in)
- Position: Defender

Team information
- Current team: Deportivo Español

Senior career*
Years	Team	Apps	(Gls)
2015–	Deportivo Español	90	(5)
- * Club domestic league appearances and goals as of 23:41, 22 May 2019 (UTC)

Nicolás Moreno (born 14 January 1994) is an Argentine professional footballer who plays as a defender for Deportivo Español.

== Career ==
Deportivo Español gave Moreno his start in first-team football. He made his senior bow in March 2015 against Deportivo Merlo in Primera B Metropolitana, which preceded a further thirteen appearances in the 2015 campaign. In the subsequent 2016 Primera B Metropolitana, Moreno scored his first goals after netting in May 2016 fixtures with Acassuso and Deportivo Riestra. In total, Moreno featured ninety times and scored five goals - alongside receiving five red cards - in five seasons with the club; which culminated with relegation to Primera C Metropolitana in 2018–19.

== Career statistics ==
As of 22 May 2019.

Appearances and goals by club, season and competition
Club	Season	League			Cup		League Cup		Continental		Other		Total	
Club	Season	Division	Apps	Goals	Apps	Goals	Apps	Goals	Apps	Goals	Apps	Goals	Apps	Goals
Deportivo Español	2015	Primera B Metropolitana	13	0	1	0	—		—		0	0	14	0
Deportivo Español	2016	Primera B Metropolitana	13	2	0	0	—		—		0	0	13	2
Deportivo Español	2016–17	Primera B Metropolitana	11	1	0	0	—		—		0	0	11	1
Deportivo Español	2017–18	Primera B Metropolitana	21	1	0	0	—		—		0	0	21	1
Deportivo Español	2018–19	Primera B Metropolitana	32	1	0	0	—		—		0	0	32	1
Career total			90	5	1	0	—		—		0	0	91	5
