= 2018 Visit Panamá Cup =

- Date: 2–7 April
- Edition: 5th
- Surface: Clay
- Location: Panama City, Panama

Champions

Singles
- (Argentina) Carlos Berlocq

Doubles
- (Germany) Yannick Hanfmann / (Germany) Kevin Krawietz
| ← 2017 · | Visit Panamá Cup |

The 2018 Visit Panamá Cup was a professional tennis tournament played on clay courts. It was the fifth edition of the tournament which was part of the 2018 ATP Challenger Tour. It took place in Panama City, Panama between 2 and 7 April 2018.

== Singles main-draw entrants ==
=== Seeds ===
| Country | Player | Rank^{1} | Seed |
|---|---|---|---|
| ~~SRB~~ | ~~Dušan Lajović~~ | ~~108~~ | ~~1~~ |
| BRA | Rogério Dutra Silva | 115 | 2 |
| GER | Yannick Hanfmann | 124 | 3 |
| ARG | Carlos Berlocq | 134 | 4 |
| BAR | Darian King | 172 | 5 |
| ARG | Renzo Olivo | 184 | 6 |
| USA | Reilly Opelka | 204 | 7 |
| USA | Mitchell Krueger | 207 | 8 |

- ^{1} Rankings are as of 19 March 2018.

=== Other entrants ===
The following players received wildcards into the singles main draw:

- (Ecuador) Emilio Gómez
- (Panama) José Gilbert Gómez
- (United States) Sebastian Korda
- (Argentina) Renzo Olivo

The following players received entry into the singles main draw as alternates:

- (Italy) Andrea Basso
- (New Zealand) Rubin Statham

The following player received entry into the singles main draw as a special exempt:

- (Brazil) Pedro Sakamoto

The following players received entry from the qualifying draw:

- (Argentina) Juan Ignacio Londero
- (Colombia) Cristian Rodríguez
- (United States) Evan Song
- (Germany) Peter Torebko

The following player received entry as a lucky loser:

- (Colombia) Felipe Mantilla

== Champions ==
=== Singles ===
- (Argentina) Carlos Berlocq def. (Slovenia) Blaž Rola 6–2, 6–0.

=== Doubles ===
- (Germany) Yannick Hanfmann / (Germany) Kevin Krawietz def. (United States) Nathan Pasha / (Ecuador) Roberto Quiroz 7–6^{(7–4)}, 6–4.
