= 2014 Visit Panamá Cup =

- Date: 17–23 March
- Edition: 3rd
- Draw: 32S / 16D
- Prize money: $40,000
- Surface: Clay
- Location: Panama City, Panama

Champions

Singles
- (Spain) Pere Riba

Doubles
- (Czech Republic) František Čermák / (Russia) Michail Elgin
← 2013 ·	Visit Panamá Cup	· 2017 →

The 2014 Visit Panamá Cup was a professional tennis tournament played on clay courts. It was the third edition of the tournament which was part of the 2014 ATP Challenger Tour. It took place in Panama City, Panama between 17 and 23 March 2014.

== Singles main-draw entrants ==
=== Seeds ===
Country	Player	Rank^{1}	Seed
ESP	Albert Ramos	84	1
SVK	Martin Kližan	88	2
AUT	Andreas Haider-Maurer	117	3
ARG	Facundo Bagnis	109	4
ARG	Facundo Argüello	121	5
ROU	Adrian Ungur	122	6
ESP	Pere Riba	124	7
SLO	Blaž Rola	128	8

- ^{1} Rankings are as of March 10, 2014.

=== Other entrants ===
The following players received wildcards into the singles main draw:

- (Chile) Christian Garin
- (Ecuador) Emilio Gómez
- (Panama) Jose Gilbert Gomez
- (United States) Jesse Witten

The following players received entry from the qualifying draw:

- (Australia) Jason Kubler
- (Brazil) Thiago Monteiro
- (Croatia) Antonio Veić
- (Argentina) Marco Trungelliti

== Champions ==
=== Singles ===
- (Spain) Pere Riba def. (Slovenia) Blaž Rola, 7–5, 5–7, 6–2

=== Doubles ===
- (Czech Republic) František Čermák / (Russia) Michail Elgin def. (Argentina) Martín Alund / (Argentina) Guillermo Durán, 4–6, 6–3, [10–8]
