= 2014 Visit Panamá Cup – Doubles =

Doubles
- 2014 Visit Panamá Cup

Final
- Champion: (Czech Republic) František Čermák (Russia) Michail Elgin
- Runner-up: (Argentina) Martín Alund (Argentina) Guillermo Durán
- Score: 4–6, 6–3, [10–8]

Events
Singles	Doubles
← 2013 ·	Visit Panamá Cup	· 2017 →

Jorge Aguilar and Sergio Galdós were the defending champion, but decided not to compete.

František Čermák and Michail Elgin won the title, defeating Martín Alund and Guillermo Durán in the final, 4–6, 6–3, [10–8].

== Seeds ==
1. (Czech Republic) František Čermák / (Russia) Michail Elgin (champions)
2. (India) Purav Raja / (India) Divij Sharan (first round)
3. (Argentina) Facundo Bagnis / (Uruguay) Pablo Cuevas (first round)
4. (Italy) Daniele Bracciali / (Italy) Potito Starace (first round)

== Draw ==
=== Key ===
- Q = Qualifier
- WC = Wild card
- LL = Lucky loser
- Alt = Alternate
- SE = Special exempt
- PR = Protected ranking
- ITF = ITF entry
- JE = Junior exempt
- w/o = Walkover
- r = Retired
- d = Defaulted
- SR = Special ranking

=== Draw ===
First round
1	(Czech Republic) F Čermák (Russia) M Elgin	5	7^{7}	[11]
(United States) V Mirzadeh (Chinese Taipei) H-y Peng	7	6^{4}	[9]
(Argentina) F Argüello (Romania) A Ungur	7^{7}	5	[11]
WC	(Chile) C Garin (Ecuador) E Gómez	6^{4}	7	[9]
3	(Argentina) F Bagnis (Uruguay) P Cuevas	4	6	[3]
(Brazil) G Clezar (Brazil) M Demoliner	6	3	[10]
(Colombia) N Barrientos (Venezuela) R Maytín	3	5
Alt	(Philippines) R Gonzales (New Zealand) A Sitak	6	7
(Spain) RR Hidalgo (Spain) P Riba	6	5	6
(Argentina) M Alund (Argentina) G Durán	4	7	10
(Brazil) RD da Silva (Portugal) G Elias	6^{5}	6	10
4	(Italy) D Bracciali (Italy) P Starace	7^{7}	3	6
WC	(Panama) Fernando García (Panama) JG Gómez	7	7^{7}
WC	(United States) Sam Barnett (United States) J Witten	5	6^{5}
(Austria) A H-Maurer (Austria) G Melzer	3	7^{7}	10
2	(India) P Raja (India) D Sharan	6	6^{4}	8

Quarterfinals
1	(Czech Republic) F Čermák (Russia) M Elgin	6^{4}	6	10
(Argentina) F Argüello (Romania) A Ungur	7^{7}	4	8
(Brazil) G Clezar (Brazil) M Demoliner	7^{7}	6
Alt	(Philippines) R Gonzales (New Zealand) A Sitak	6^{4}	3
(Argentina) M Alund (Argentina) G Durán	6	7
(Brazil) RD da Silva (Portugal) G Elias	4	5
WC	(Panama) F García (Panama) JG Gómez	0	0
(Austria) A H-Maurer (Austria) G Melzer	6	6

Semifinals
1	(Czech Republic) F Čermák (Russia) M Elgin	7	7^{7}
(Brazil) G Clezar (Brazil) M Demoliner	5	6^{1}
(Argentina) M Alund (Argentina) G Durán	6	6
(Austria) A H-Maurer (Austria) G Melzer	2	3

Final
1	(Czech Republic) F Čermák (Russia) M Elgin	4	6	[10]
(Argentina) M Alund (Argentina) G Durán	6	3	[8]
