= 2014 Visit Panamá Cup – Singles =

Singles
- 2014 Visit Panamá Cup

Final
- Champion: (Spain) Pere Riba
- Runner-up: (Slovenia) Blaž Rola
- Score: 7–5, 5–7, 6–2

Events
Singles	Doubles
← 2013 ·	Visit Panamá Cup	· 2017 →

Rubén Ramírez Hidalgo was the defending champion, but decided not to compete.

Pere Riba won the title, defeating Blaž Rola in the final, 7–5, 5–7, 6–2.

== Seeds ==
1. (Spain) Albert Ramos (semifinals)
2. (Slovakia) Martin Kližan (second round)
3. (Austria) Andreas Haider-Maurer (quarterfinals)
4. (Argentina) Facundo Bagnis (first round)
5. (Argentina) Facundo Argüello (second round)
6. (Romania) Adrian Ungur (quarterfinals)
7. (Spain) Pere Riba (champion)
8. (Slovenia) Blaž Rola (final)

== Draw ==
=== Key ===
- Q = Qualifier
- WC = Wild card
- LL = Lucky loser
- Alt = Alternate
- SE = Special exempt
- PR = Protected ranking
- ITF = ITF entry
- JE = Junior exempt
- w/o = Walkover
- r = Retired
- d = Defaulted
- SR = Special ranking

=== Finals ===
Semifinals
1	(Spain) Albert Ramos	3	6^{4}
8	(Slovenia) Blaž Rola	6	7^{7}
(Austria) Gerald Melzer	5	3
7	(Spain) Pere Riba	7	6

Final
8	(Slovenia) Blaž Rola	5	7	2
7	(Spain) Pere Riba	7	5	6

=== Top half ===
First round
1	(Spain) A Ramos	6	7^{7}
(Ecuador) E Gómez	3	6^{5}
(Brazil) G Clezar	6	3	6
Q	(Australia) J Kubler	4	6	3
(United Kingdom) J Ward	2	1
(Portugal) G Elias	6	6
(Argentina) M Alund	4	4
6	(Romania) A Ungur	6	6
3	(Austria) A Haider-Maurer	7	7
(Italy) L Giustino	5	5
WC	(United States) J Witten	7	0
(Germany) M Zverev	5	0^{r}
Q	(Brazil) T Monteiro	4	4
(Italy) P Starace	6	6
Q	(Croatia) A Veić	2	1
8	(Slovenia) B Rola	6	6

Second round
1	(Spain) A Ramos	6	6
(Brazil) G Clezar	3	4
(Portugal) G Elias	4	4
6	(Romania) A Ungur	6	6
3	(Austria) A Haider-Maurer	7^{7}	6
WC	(United States) J Witten	6^{3}	4
(Italy) P Starace	3	6^{2}
8	(Slovenia) B Rola	6	7^{7}

Quarterfinals
1	(Spain) A Ramos	4	6	6
6	(Romania) A Ungur	6	2	4
3	(Austria) A Haider-Maurer	5	3
8	(Slovenia) B Rola	7	6

Semifinals
1	(Spain) A Ramos	3	6^{4}
8	(Slovenia) B Rola	6	7^{7}

=== Bottom half ===
First round
5	(Argentina) F Argüello	7	7
(Spain) R Ramírez Hidalgo	5	5
(Australia) M Reid	2	4
(Uruguay) P Cuevas	6	6
WC	(Chile) C Garin	4	7^{7}	2
(Austria) G Melzer	6	6^{1}	6
(Brazil) R Dutra da Silva	3	6	6
4	(Argentina) F Bagnis	6	3	2
7	(Spain) P Riba	1	6	6
(Argentina) R Olivo	6	4	2
Q	(Argentina) M Trungelliti	6	6
WC	(Panama) JG Gómez	1	3
(Chile) P Capdeville	3	1
(Argentina) G Andreozzi	6	6
(Venezuela) D Souto	4	2
2	(Slovakia) M Kližan	6	6

Second round
5	(Argentina) F Argüello	4	4
(Uruguay) P Cuevas	6	6
(Austria) G Melzer	6	6
(Brazil) R Dutra da Silva	3	1
7	(Spain) P Riba	7^{7}	6
Q	(Argentina) M Trungelliti	6^{5}	2
(Argentina) G Andreozzi	6	2	6
2	(Slovakia) M Kližan	4	6	2

Quarterfinals
(Uruguay) P Cuevas	6	3	6^{4}
(Austria) G Melzer	3	6	7^{7}
7	(Spain) P Riba	6	6
(Argentina) G Andreozzi	4	4

Semifinals
(Austria) G Melzer	5	3
7	(Spain) P Riba	7	6
