= 2001 Davis Cup Americas Zone Group IV =

International tennis competition

The Americas Zone was one of the three zones of the regional Davis Cup competition in 2001.

In the Americas Zone there were four different tiers, called groups, in which teams competed against each other to advance to the upper tier. The top two teams in Group IV advanced to the Americas Zone Group III in 2002. All other teams remained in Group IV.

== Participating nations ==
- Antigua and Barbuda
- Barbados
- Eastern Caribbean
- Haiti
- Panama
- Saint Lucia
- U.S. Virgin Islands

=== Draw ===
- Venue: Cercle Bellevue, Port-au-Prince, Haiti
- Date: 5–11 March

	HAI	PAN	ECA	LCA	BAR	ISV	ATG	RR; W–L	Match; W–L	Set; W–L	Standings
Haiti		2–1	3–0	3–0	3–0	2–1	3–0	6–0	16–2 (89%)	50–8 (86%)	1
Panama	1–2		3–0	3–0	3–0	3–0	3–0	5–1	16–2 (89%)	49–10 (83%)	2
Eastern Caribbean	0–3	0–3		2–1	2–1	1–2	2–1	3–3	7–11 (39%)	28–41 (41%)	3
Saint Lucia	0–3	0–3	1–2		2–1	2–1	1–2	2–4	6–12 (33%)	22–39 (36%)	5
Barbados	0–3	0–3	1–2	1–2		2–1	2–1	2–4	6–12 (33%)	26–37 (41%)	4
U.S. Virgin Islands	1–2	0–3	2–1	1–2	1–2		3–0	2–4	8–10 (44%)	26–41 (39%)	6
Antigua and Barbuda	0–3	0–3	1–2	2–1	1–2	0–3		1–5	4–14 (22%)	20–45 (31%)	7

- Haiti and Panama promoted to Group III in 2001.

== Results ==
=== Panama vs. Eastern Caribbean ===
Panama
3
Cercle Bellevue, Port-au-Prince, Haiti
5 March 2001

Eastern Caribbean
0

			1	2	3	4	5
1	(Panama) (Eastern Caribbean)	Chadd Valdes; Glynn James	4; 0	4; 0	4; 0
2	(Panama) (Eastern Caribbean)	Arnulfo Courtney; Kirt Cable	4; 1	4; 0	4; 0
3	(Panama) (Eastern Caribbean)	Carlos Silva / John Silva; Hayden Ashton / Glynn James	5^{10} 4^{8}	4; 0	4; 0

=== Barbados vs. U.S. Virgin Islands ===
Barbados
2
Cercle Bellevue, Port-au-Prince, Haiti
5 March 2001

U.S. Virgin Islands
1

			1	2	3	4	5
1	(Barbados) (United States Virgin Islands)	Damien Applewhaite; John Richards	1; 4	4; 2	3; 5	4; 2	0; 4
2	(Barbados) (United States Virgin Islands)	James Betts; Louis Taylor III	4; 1	4; 1	4; 1
3	(Barbados) (United States Virgin Islands)	James Betts / Michael Date; Nicholas Bass / Gregory Newton	4; 1	4; 2	5; 3

=== Saint Lucia vs. Haiti ===
Saint Lucia
0
Cercle Bellevue, Port-au-Prince, Haiti
5 March 2001

Haiti
3

			1	2	3	4	5
1	(Saint Lucia) (Haiti)	Kane Easter; Iphton Louis	1; 4	1; 4	2; 4
2	(Saint Lucia) (Haiti)	David d'Auvergne; Ronald Agénor	0; 4	0; 4	0; 4
3	(Saint Lucia) (Haiti)	David d'Auvergne / Kane Easter; Ronald Agénor / Iphton Louis	2; 4	2; 4	1; 4

=== Panama vs. U.S. Virgin Islands ===
Panama
3
Cercle Bellevue, Port-au-Prince, Haiti
6 March 2001

U.S. Virgin Islands
0

			1	2	3	4	5
1	(Panama) (United States Virgin Islands)	Chadd Valdes; Nicholas Bass	4; 0	4; 0	4; 0
2	(Panama) (United States Virgin Islands)	Arnulfo Courtney; Gregory Newton	4; 0	4; 1	5; 3
3	(Panama) (United States Virgin Islands)	Carlos Silva / John Silva; Gregory Newton / John Richards	4; 0	4; 0	4^{3} 5^{7}	4; 1

=== Antigua and Barbuda vs. Barbados ===
Antigua and Barbuda
1
Cercle Bellevue, Port-au-Prince, Haiti
6 March 2001

Barbados
2

			1	2	3	4	5
1	(Antigua and Barbuda) (Barbados)	Carlton Bedminster; Michael Date	4; 0	4; 1	4; 1
2	(Antigua and Barbuda) (Barbados)	Jerry Williams; James Betts	5; 3	4^{2} 5^{7}	0; 4	4^{3} 5^{7}
3	(Antigua and Barbuda) (Barbados)	Carlton Bedminster / Kevin Gardner; James Betts / Michael Date	1; 4	0; 4	3; 5

=== Eastern Caribbean vs. Saint Lucia ===
Eastern Caribbean
2
Cercle Bellevue, Port-au-Prince, Haiti
6 March 2001

Saint Lucia
1

			1	2	3	4	5
1	(Eastern Caribbean) (Saint Lucia)	Glynn James; Sirsean Arlain	5^{11} 4^{9}	4; 1	4; 1
2	(Eastern Caribbean) (Saint Lucia)	Kirt Cable; Kane Easter	0; 4	4; 2	5^{7} 4^{2}	4; 1
3	(Eastern Caribbean) (Saint Lucia)	Hayden Ashton / Glynn James; Sirsean Arlain / Gary Eugene	2; 4	1; 4	4^{5} 5^{7}

=== Panama vs. Antigua and Barbuda ===
Panama
3
Cercle Bellevue, Port-au-Prince, Haiti
7 March 2001

Antigua and Barbuda
0

			1	2	3	4	5
1	(Panama) (Antigua and Barbuda)	Chadd Valdes; Carlton Bedminster	4; 0	4; 2	4; 2
2	(Panama) (Antigua and Barbuda)	Arnulfo Courtney; Jerry Williams	4; 0	4; 2	4; 0
3	(Panama) (Antigua and Barbuda)	Carlos Silva / John Silva; Carl Johnson / Jerry Williams	4; 2	5; 3	4; 2

=== Eastern Caribbean vs, U.S. Virgin Islands ===
Eastern Caribbean
1
Cercle Bellevue, Port-au-Prince, Haiti
7 March 2001

U.S. Virgin Islands
2

			1	2	3	4	5
1	(Eastern Caribbean) (United States Virgin Islands)	Glynn James; Nicholas Bass	4^{6} 5^{8}	5^{7} 4^{4}	1; 4	2; 4
2	(Eastern Caribbean) (United States Virgin Islands)	Kirt Cable; Louis Taylor III	2; 4	4; 2	5; 3	4; 1
3	(Eastern Caribbean) (United States Virgin Islands)	Hayden Ashton / Kirt Cable; Gregory Newton / John Richards	2; 4	4; 1	2; 4	2; 4

=== Haiti vs. Barbados ===
Haiti
3
Cercle Bellevue, Port-au-Prince, Haiti
7 March 2001

Barbados
0

			1	2	3	4	5
1	(Haiti) (Barbados)	Iphton Louis; Damien Applewhaite	4; 0	4; 1	4; 2
2	(Haiti) (Barbados)	Ronald Agénor; James Betts	4; 0	4; 0	4; 0
3	(Haiti) (Barbados)	Ronald Agénor / Bertrand Lacombe; Akil Burgess / Michael Date	4; 2	1; 0				retired

=== Antigua and Barbuda vs. Eastern Caribbean ===
Antigua and Barbuda
1
Cercle Bellevue, Port-au-Prince, Haiti
8 March 2001

Eastern Caribbean
2

			1	2	3	4	5
1	(Antigua and Barbuda) (Eastern Caribbean)	Kevin Gardner; Glynn James	2; 4	4; 1	4; 2	1; 4	1; 4
2	(Antigua and Barbuda) (Eastern Caribbean)	Carlton Bedminster; Kirt Cable	5^{8} 4^{6}	4^{0} 5^{7}	1; 4	0; 4
3	(Antigua and Barbuda) (Eastern Caribbean)	Carl Johnson / Jerry Williams; Hayden Ashton / Dexter Christian	5; 3	3; 5	5^{7} 4^{3}	4^{5} 5^{7}	4; 2

=== Barbados vs. Saint Lucia ===
Barbados
1
Cercle Bellevue, Port-au-Prince, Haiti
8 March 2001

Saint Lucia
2

			1	2	3	4	5
1	(Barbados) (Saint Lucia)	Akil Burgess; Sirsean Arlain	5^{7} 4^{3}	2; 4	1; 4	2; 4
2	(Barbados) (Saint Lucia)	James Betts; Kane Easter	0; 4	4; 2	4; 1	3; 5	1; 4
3	(Barbados) (Saint Lucia)	James Betts / Akil Burgess; David d'Auvergne / Gary Eugene	5^{7} 4^{4}	4; 2	4; 0

=== U.S. Virgin Islands vs. Haiti ===
U.S. Virgin Islands
1
Cercle Bellevue, Port-au-Prince, Haiti
8 March 2001

Haiti
2

			1	2	3	4	5
1	(United States Virgin Islands) (Haiti)	Nicholas Bass; Joel Allen	4; 2	4^{1} 5^{7}	1; 4	4; 2	4; 0
2	(United States Virgin Islands) (Haiti)	John Richards; Ronald Agénor	0; 4	1; 4	0; 4
3	(United States Virgin Islands) (Haiti)	Gregory Newton / John Richards; Ronald Agénor / Iphton Louis	0; 4	2; 4	4^{6} 5^{8}

=== Panama vs. Saint Lucia ===
Panama
3
Cercle Bellevue, Port-au-Prince, Haiti
9 March 2001

Saint Lucia
0

			1	2	3	4	5
1	(Panama) (Saint Lucia)	Chadd Valdes; Sirsean Arlain	4; 1	4; 1	4; 1
2	(Panama) (Saint Lucia)	Arnulfo Courtney; Kane Easter	4; 1	4; 0	5; 3
3	(Panama) (Saint Lucia)	Carlos Silva / John Silva; Sirsean Arlain / Kane Easter	4; 2	2; 4	4; 2	4; 2

=== Antigua and Barbuda vs. U.S. Virgin Islands ===
Antigua and Barbuda
0
Cercle Bellevue, Port-au-Prince, Haiti
9 March 2001

U.S. Virgin Islands
3

			1	2	3	4	5
1	(Antigua and Barbuda) (United States Virgin Islands)	Carl Johnson; Nicholas Bass	5^{7} 4^{4}	3; 5	0; 4	4; 0	0; 4
2	(Antigua and Barbuda) (United States Virgin Islands)	Carlton Bedminster; Louis Taylor III	3; 5	1; 4	4; 0	2; 4
3	(Antigua and Barbuda) (United States Virgin Islands)	Kevin Gardner / Jerry Williams; Gregory Newton / John Richards	3; 5	5; 3	2; 4	2; 4

=== Eastern Caribbean vs. Haiti ===
Eastern Caribbean
0
Cercle Bellevue, Port-au-Prince, Haiti
9 March 2001

Haiti
3

			1	2	3	4	5
1	(Eastern Caribbean) (Haiti)	Glynn James; Iphton Louis	4; 1	2; 4	1; 4	4^{4} 5^{7}
2	(Eastern Caribbean) (Haiti)	Kirt Cable; Ronald Agénor	1; 4	0; 4	0; 4
3	(Eastern Caribbean) (Haiti)	Hayden Ashton / Glynn James; Ronald Agénor / Joel Allen	0; 4	0; 4	1; 4

=== Panama vs. Haiti ===
Panama
1
Cercle Bellevue, Port-au-Prince, Haiti
10 March 2001

Haiti
2

			1	2	3	4	5
1	(Panama) (Haiti)	Chadd Valdes; Iphton Louis	4; 1	3; 5	2; 4	2; 4
2	(Panama) (Haiti)	Arnulfo Courtney; Ronald Agénor	2; 4	0; 4	2; 4
3	(Panama) (Haiti)	Carlos Silva / John Silva; Joel Allen / Bertrand Lacombe	3; 5	4; 2	1; 4	4; 2	5; 3

=== Antigua and Barbuda vs. Saint Lucia ===
Antigua and Barbuda
2
Cercle Bellevue, Port-au-Prince, Haiti
10 March 2001

Saint Lucia
1

			1	2	3	4	5
1	(Antigua and Barbuda) (Saint Lucia)	Carl Johnson; Sirsean Arlain	0; 4	3; 5	1; 4
2	(Antigua and Barbuda) (Saint Lucia)	Carlton Bedminster; David d'Auvergne	4; 0	5; 3	4; 2
3	(Antigua and Barbuda) (Saint Lucia)	Carlton Bedminster / Jerry Williams; Sirsean Arlain / Kane Easter	2; 4	4; 1	4; 2	4; 1

=== Barbados vs. Eastern Caribbean ===
Barbados
1
Cercle Bellevue, Port-au-Prince, Haiti
10 March 2001

Eastern Caribbean
2

			1	2	3	4	5
1	(Barbados) (Eastern Caribbean)	Damien Applewhaite; Glynn James	4; 2	3; 5	2; 4	1; 4
2	(Barbados) (Eastern Caribbean)	James Betts; Kirt Cable	3; 5	4; 2	0; 4	4; 1	8; 6
3	(Barbados) (Eastern Caribbean)	James Betts / Michael Date; Hayden Ashton / Glynn James	2; 4	3; 5	5^{7} 4^{4}	5; 3	3; 5

=== Panama vs. Barbados ===
Panama
3
Cercle Bellevue, Port-au-Prince, Haiti
11 March 2001

Barbados
0

			1	2	3	4	5
1	(Panama) (Barbados)	Carlos Silva; Michael Date	4; 1	5^{7} 4^{4}	4; 1
2	(Panama) (Barbados)	John Silva; Damien Applewhaite	4; 2	5^{8} 4^{6}	4; 2
3	(Panama) (Barbados)	Carlos Silva / John Silva; Akil Burgess / Michael Date	4; 2	4; 1	4; 1

=== Antigua and Barbuda vs. Haiti ===
Antigua and Barbuda
0
Cercle Bellevue, Port-au-Prince, Haiti
11 March 2001

Haiti
3

			1	2	3	4	5
1	(Antigua and Barbuda) (Haiti)	Carlton Bedminster; Iphton Louis	2; 4	1; 4	1; 4
2	(Antigua and Barbuda) (Haiti)	Jerry Williams; Ronald Agénor	2; 4	0; 4	2; 4
3	(Antigua and Barbuda) (Haiti)	Kevin Gardner / Carl Johnson; Ronald Agénor / Iphton Louis	1; 4	1; 4	1; 4

=== Saint Lucia vs. U.S. Virgin Islands ===
Saint Lucia
2
Cercle Bellevue, Port-au-Prince, Haiti
11 March 2001

U.S. Virgin Islands
1

			1	2	3	4	5
1	(Saint Lucia) (United States Virgin Islands)	Sirsean Arlain; Nicholas Bass	4; 0	4; 0	4; 1
2	(Saint Lucia) (United States Virgin Islands)	Kane Easter; John Richards	5; 3	4; 1	4; 2
3	(Saint Lucia) (United States Virgin Islands)	David d'Auvergne / Gary Eugene; Gregory Newton / John Richards	5; 3	1; 4	2; 4	2; 4
