= 2011 Davis Cup Americas Zone Group IV =

International tennis competition

The Americas Zone is one of the three zones of regional Davis Cup competition in 2011.

In the Americas Zone there are four different groups in which teams compete against each other to advance to the next group. The three teams in Group IV played in a single round-robin tournament. All of them will be promoted to the Americas Zone Group III for 2012 as Groups III and IV were merged for 2012.

The Division IV tournament was held in the Week commencing 13 June 2011 at Santa Cruz, Bolivia

== Draw ==
- Venue: Club de Tenis Santa Cruz, Santa Cruz, Bolivia (outdoor clay)
- Date: 16–18 June

Team	Pld	W	L	MF	MA	Pts
Trinidad and Tobago	2	2	0	4	2	2
Panama	2	1	1	3	3	1
U.S. Virgin Islands	2	0	2	2	4	0

All of them promoted to Group III for 2012 as Groups III and IV were merged for 2012.

== Results ==
=== Trinidad & Tobago vs. U.S. Virgin Islands ===
Trinidad and Tobago
2
Club de Tenis Santa Cruz, Santa Cruz, Bolivia
16 June 2011
clay (outdoor)

U.S. Virgin Islands
1

			1	2	3
1	(Trinidad and Tobago) (United States Virgin Islands)	Liam Gomez; Kristepher Elien	4; 6	6; 3	5; 7
2	(Trinidad and Tobago) (United States Virgin Islands)	Yohansey Williams; Brian Oldfield	6; 1	6; 0
3	(Trinidad and Tobago) (United States Virgin Islands)	Yohansey Williams / Vaughn Wilson; Nicholas Bass / Kristepher Elien	6; 1	6; 4

=== Panama vs. U.S. Virgin Islands ===
Panama
2
Club de Tenis Santa Cruz, Santa Cruz, Bolivia
17 June 2011
clay (outdoor)

U.S. Virgin Islands
1

			1	2	3
1	(Panama) (United States Virgin Islands)	Carlos Silva; Kristepher Elien	7; 5	6; 4
2	(Panama) (United States Virgin Islands)	Alberto González; Brian Oldfield	6; 3	6; 0
3	(Panama) (United States Virgin Islands)	Juan-Jose Fuentes / John Silva; Nicholas Bass / Kristepher Elien	4; 6	4; 6

=== Panama vs. Trinidad & Tobago ===
Panama
1
Club de Tenis Santa Cruz, Santa Cruz, Bolivia
18 June 2011
clay (outdoor)

Trinidad and Tobago
2

			1	2	3
1	(Panama) (Trinidad and Tobago)	Juan-Jose Fuentes; Vaughn Wilson	4; 6	2; 6
2	(Panama) (Trinidad and Tobago)	Carlos Silva; Yohansey Williams	3; 6	2; 6
3	(Panama) (Trinidad and Tobago)	Carlos Silva / John Silva; Yohansey Williams / Vaughn Wilson	6; 4	6; 7	7; 5
