= 2013 Visit Panamá Cup – Doubles =

Doubles
- 2013 Visit Panamá Cup

Final
- Champions: (Chile) Jorge Aguilar (Peru) Sergio Galdós
- Runners-up: (Ecuador) Júlio César Campozano (Colombia) Alejandro González
- Score: 6–4, 6–4

Events
Singles	Doubles
← 2012 ·	Visit Panamá Cup	· 2014 →

Júlio César Campozano and Alejandro González were the defending champions and reached the final, but lost to Jorge Aguilar and Sergio Galdós 4–6, 4–6.

== Seeds ==
1. (Austria) Oliver Marach / (Germany) Frank Moser (first round)
2. (Argentina) Facundo Bagnis / (Argentina) Federico Delbonis (first round)
3. (Argentina) Renzo Olivo / (Argentina) Marco Trungelliti (first round)
4. (Brazil) Fabiano de Paula / (Italy) Claudio Grassi (quarterfinals)

== Draw ==
=== Key ===
- Q = Qualifier
- WC = Wild card
- LL = Lucky loser
- Alt = Alternate
- SE = Special exempt
- PR = Protected ranking
- ITF = ITF entry
- JE = Junior exempt
- w/o = Walkover
- r = Retired
- d = Defaulted
- SR = Special ranking

=== Draw ===
First round
1	(Austria) O Marach (Germany) F Moser	7^{7}	6^{5}	[8]
(Chile) J Aguilar (Peru) S Galdós	6^{4}	7^{7}	[10]
WC	(United States) Sam Barnett (Romania) C-I Gârd	2	1
(United States) V Mirzadeh (Canada) P Polansky	6	6
3	(Argentina) R Olivo (Argentina) M Trungelliti	6^{5}	7^{7}	[7]
(Spain) D Muñoz de la Nava (Spain) R Ramírez Hidalgo	7^{7}	6^{5}	[10]
(Colombia) N Barrientos (Germany) A Satschko	6	6
(Italy) F Cipolla (Italy) R Ghedin	3	1
WC	(Ecuador) I Endara (Panama) Walner Espinoza	4	5
PR	(France) Laurent Rochette (France) M Teixeira	6	7
(France) J Dasnières de Veigy (France) Florian Reynet	3	3
4	(Brazil) F de Paula (Italy) C Grassi	6	6
(Dominican Republic) V Estrella (Colombia) C Salamanca	4	4
WC	(Chile) N Massú (Chile) G Rivera-Aránguiz	6	6
(Ecuador) JC Campozano (Colombia) A González	7^{7}	3	[10]
2	(Argentina) F Bagnis (Argentina) F Delbonis	6^{5}	6	[3]

Quarterfinals
(Chile) J Aguilar (Peru) S Galdós	6	7^{7}
(United States) V Mirzadeh (Canada) P Polansky	1	6^{5}
(Spain) D Muñoz de la Nava (Spain) R Ramírez Hidalgo	6	6
(Colombia) N Barrientos (Germany) A Satschko	3	3
PR	(France) L Rochette (France) M Teixeira	6	6
4	(Brazil) F de Paula (Italy) C Grassi	4	4
WC	(Chile) N Massú (Chile) G Rivera-Aránguiz	1	2
(Ecuador) JC Campozano (Colombia) A González	6	6

Semifinals
(Chile) J Aguilar (Peru) S Galdós	7^{7}	6^{3}	[10]
(Spain) D Muñoz de la Nava (Spain) R Ramírez Hidalgo	6^{5}	7^{7}	[2]
PR	(France) L Rochette (France) M Teixeira	0	1^{r}
(Ecuador) JC Campozano (Colombia) A González	6	2

Final
(Chile) J Aguilar (Peru) S Galdós	6	6
(Ecuador) JC Campozano (Colombia) A González	4	4
