= 2012 Visit Panamá Cup =

- Date: 2–8 July
- Edition: 1st
- Surface: Clay
- Location: Panama City, Panama

Champions

Singles
- (Brazil) Rogério Dutra da Silva

Doubles
- (Ecuador) Júlio César Campozano / (Colombia) Alejandro González
Visit Panamá Cup	· 2013 →

The 2012 Visit Panamá Cup was a professional tennis tournament played on clay courts. It was the first edition of the tournament which was part of the 2012 ATP Challenger Tour. It took place in Panama City, Panama between 2 and 8 July 2012.

== Singles main draw entrants ==
=== Seeds ===
Country	Player	Rank^{1}	Seed
USA	Michael Russell	112	1
BRA	Rogério Dutra da Silva	114	2
CAN	Peter Polansky	179	3
COL	Carlos Salamanca	189	4
COL	Alejandro González	226	5
DOM	Víctor Estrella	228	6
COL	Eduardo Struvay	273	7
ECU	Júlio César Campozano	331	8

- ^{1} Rankings are as of June 25, 2012.

=== Other entrants ===
The following players received wildcards into the singles main draw:

- (Panama) Walner Espinoza
- (Sweden) William Karlberg
- (Chile) Gonzalo Lama
- (Chile) Nicolás Massú

The following players received entry from the qualifying draw:

- (Switzerland) Luca Margaroli
- (United States) Phillip Simmonds
- (Colombia) Felipe Escobar
- (Argentina) Christian Ignacio Benedetti

== Champions ==
=== Singles ===
- (Brazil) Rogério Dutra da Silva def. (Canada) Peter Polansky, 6–3, 6–0

=== Doubles ===
- (Ecuador) Júlio César Campozano / (Colombia) Alejandro González def. (United States) Daniel Kosakowski / (Canada) Peter Polansky, 6–4, 7–5
