= 2017 Visit Panamá Cup =

- Date: 3–8 April
- Edition: 4th
- Surface: Clay
- Location: Panama City, Panama

Champions

Singles
- (Brazil) Rogério Dutra Silva

Doubles
- (Peru) Sergio Galdós / (Brazil) Caio Zampieri
← 2014 ·	Visit Panamá Cup	· 2018 →

The 2017 Visit Panamá Cup will be a professional tennis tournament played on clay courts. It will be the fourth edition of the tournament which will be part of the 2017 ATP Challenger Tour. It will take place in Panama City, Panama between 3 and 8 April 2017.

== Point distribution ==
Event	W	F	SF	QF	Round of 16	Round of 32	Q	Q2
Singles	80	48	29	15	7	0	3	0
Doubles	80	48	29	15	0	—	—	—

== Singles main-draw entrants ==
=== Seeds ===
Country	Player	Rank^{1}	Seed
ARG	Horacio Zeballos	75	1
BRA	Rogério Dutra Silva	84	2
DOM	Víctor Estrella Burgos	91	3
ARG	Nicolás Kicker	104	4
USA	Bjorn Fratangelo	115	5
SUI	Henri Laaksonen	117	6
USA	Stefan Kozlov	122	7
BRA	João Souza	123	8

- ^{1} Rankings are as of March 20, 2017.

=== Other entrants ===
The following players received wildcards into the singles main draw:

- (Argentina) Mateo Galdón
- (Panama) José Gilbert Gómez
- (Serbia) Miomir Kecmanović
- (Austria) Oliver Marach

The following player received entry into the singles main draw using a protected ranking:

- (United States) Bradley Klahn

The following players received entry from the qualifying draw:

- (United States) Bjorn Fratangelo
- (Germany) Kevin Krawietz
- (Argentina) Tomás Lipovšek Puches
- (Hungary) Péter Nagy

== Champions ==
=== Singles ===
- (Brazil) Rogério Dutra Silva def. (Serbia) Peđa Krstin 6–2, 6–4.

=== Doubles ===
- (Peru) Sergio Galdós / (Brazil) Caio Zampieri def. (Germany) Kevin Krawietz / (Spain) Adrián Menéndez Maceiras 1–6, 7–6^{(7–5)}, [10–7].
