= 2017 Visit Panamá Cup – Doubles =

Doubles
- 2017 Visit Panamá Cup

Final
- Champions: (Peru) Sergio Galdós; (Brazil) Caio Zampieri
- Runners-up: (Germany) Kevin Krawietz; (Spain) Adrián Menéndez Maceiras
- Score: 1–6, 7–6^{(7–5)}, [10–7]

Events
Singles	Doubles
- Visit Panamá Cup

František Čermák and Mikhail Elgin were the defending champions but chose not to defend their title.

Sergio Galdós and Caio Zampieri won the title after defeating Kevin Krawietz and Adrián Menéndez Maceiras 1–6, 7–6^{(7–5)}, [10–7] in the final.

== Seeds ==
1. (Austria) Oliver Marach / (Chile) Julio Peralta (first round)
2. (Brazil) Rogério Dutra Silva / (Brazil) André Sá (semifinals)
3. (Peru) Sergio Galdós / (Brazil) Caio Zampieri (champions)
4. (Uruguay) Ariel Behar / (Brazil) Fabiano de Paula (semifinals)

== Draw ==
Key

- Q = Qualifier
- WC = Wild card
- LL = Lucky loser
- Alt = Alternate
- ITF = ITF entry
- PR = Protected ranking
- SR = Special ranking
- SE = Special exempt
- JE = Junior exempt
- JR = Junior Accelerator Programme entrant
- CO = College Accelerator Programme entrant
- NG = Next Gen Accelerator Program entrant
- w/o = Walkover
- r = Retired
- d = Defaulted

First round

Quarterfinals

Semifinals

Final

1
- (Austria) O Marach
- (Chile) J Peralta
5
7^{7}
[7]

- (Germany) K Krawietz
- (Spain) A Menéndez Maceiras
7
6^{3}
[10]

- (Germany) K Krawietz
- (Spain) A Menéndez Maceiras
6
6

- (Australia) C O'Connell
- (Egypt) M Safwat
6
6

- (Australia) C O'Connell
- (Egypt) M Safwat
1
0

WC
- (Panama) Iván Rebolledo
- (Austria) M Slanar
0
3

- (Germany) K Krawietz
- (Spain) A Menéndez Maceiras
6
6

4
- (Uruguay) A Behar
- (Brazil) F de Paula
6
6

4
- (Uruguay) A Behar
- (Brazil) F de Paula
2
4

WC
- (Panama) JG Gómez
- (Panama) L Gómez
2
4

4
- (Uruguay) A Behar
- (Brazil) F de Paula
6
6

- (United States) S Bangoura
- (United States) M Krueger
w/o

- (United States) S Bangoura
- (United States) M Krueger
0
3

- (Italy) A Arnaboldi
- (Switzerland) L Margaroli

- (Germany) K Krawietz
- (Spain) A Menéndez Maceiras
6
6^{5}
[7]

- (Argentina) F Argüello
- (Argentina) T Lipovšek Puches
6
6

3
- (Peru) S Galdós
- (Brazil) C Zampieri
1
7^{7}
[10]

- (Canada) S Diez
- (United States) A El Mihdawy
3
0

- (Argentina) F Argüello
- (Argentina) T Lipovšek Puches
3
2

WC
- (Colombia) Gonzalo Ramírez Cumaco
- (Panama) J Silva
1
1

3
- (Peru) S Galdós
- (Brazil) C Zampieri
6
6

3
- (Peru) S Galdós
- (Brazil) C Zampieri
6
6

3
- (Peru) S Galdós
- (Brazil) C Zampieri
7^{8}
2
[10]

- (Serbia) P Krstin
- (Argentina) A Velotti
7^{7}
4
[3]

2
- (Brazil) R Dutra Silva
- (Brazil) A Sá
6^{6}
6
[6]

Alt
(Colombia) JS Gómez
(Colombia) Felipe Mantilla
6^{4}
6
[10]

Alt
(Colombia) JS Gómez
(Colombia) F Mantilla
3
6
[4]

PR
- (United States) B Fratangelo
- (United States) B Klahn
4
4

2
- (Brazil) R Dutra Silva
- (Brazil) A Sá
6
3
[10]

2
- (Brazil) R Dutra Silva
- (Brazil) A Sá
6
6
