= 2018 Visit Panamá Cup – Singles =

Singles
- 2018 Visit Panamá Cup

Final
- Champion: (Argentina) Carlos Berlocq
- Runner-up: (Slovenia) Blaž Rola
- Score: 6–2, 6–0

Events
Singles	Doubles
- Visit Panamá Cup

Rogério Dutra Silva was the defending champion but lost in the first round to Evan Song.

Carlos Berlocq won the title after defeating Blaž Rola 6–2, 6–0 in the final.

== Seeds ==
1. (Serbia) Dušan Lajović (withdrew)
2. (Brazil) Rogério Dutra Silva (first round)
3. (Germany) Yannick Hanfmann (quarterfinals)
4. (Argentina) Carlos Berlocq (champion)
5. (Barbados) Darian King (first round)
6. (Argentina) Renzo Olivo (second round)
7. (United States) Reilly Opelka (first round)
8. (United States) Mitchell Krueger (second round)

== Draw ==
Key

- Q = Qualifier
- WC = Wild card
- LL = Lucky loser
- Alt = Alternate
- ITF = ITF entry
- PR = Protected ranking
- SR = Special ranking
- SE = Special exempt
- JE = Junior exempt
- JR = Junior Accelerator Programme entrant
- CO = College Accelerator Programme entrant
- NG = Next Gen Accelerator Program entrant
- w/o = Walkover
- r = Retired
- d = Defaulted

=== Finals ===
Semifinals
Q	(Argentina) Juan Ignacio Londero	7^{7}	5	6^{1}
4	(Argentina) Carlos Berlocq	6^{3}	7	7^{7}
(Slovenia) Blaž Rola	6	6
(Argentina) Andrea Collarini	2	3

Final
4	(Argentina) Carlos Berlocq	6	6
(Slovenia) Blaž Rola	2	0

=== Top half ===
First round
LL	(Colombia) Felipe Mantilla	7^{7}	4	2
(Germany) J Choinski	6^{4}	6	6
(Serbia) P Krstin	5	2
(United Kingdom) J Clarke	7	6
WC	(Panama) JG Gómez	2	1
Q	(Argentina) JI Londero	6	6
(Croatia) A Pavić	6	6
5	(Barbados) D King	1	4
4	(Argentina) C Berlocq	6	6
(Argentina) F Coria	4	1
SE	(Brazil) P Sakamoto	2	2
Alt	(Italy) A Basso	6	6
(Dominican Republic) J Hernández-Fernández	2	6	7
WC	(Ecuador) E Gómez	6	2	5
(Ecuador) R Quiroz	3	6	4
8	(United States) M Krueger	6	3	6

Second round
(Germany) J Choinski	6	6
(United Kingdom) J Clarke	4	2
Q	(Argentina) JI Londero	6	6
(Croatia) A Pavić	4	4
4	(Argentina) C Berlocq	6	6
Alt	(Italy) A Basso	2	4
(Dominican Republic) J Hernández-Fernández	6	3	6
8	(United States) M Krueger	3	6	4

Quarterfinals
(Germany) J Choinski	3	1
Q	(Argentina) JI Londero	6	6
4	(Argentina) C Berlocq	7	6
(Dominican Republic) J Hernández-Fernández	5	2

Semifinals
Q	(Argentina) JI Londero	7^{7}	5	6^{1}
4	(Argentina) C Berlocq	6^{3}	7	7^{7}

=== Bottom half ===
First round
7	(United States) R Opelka	3	1
(Slovenia) B Rola	6	6
WC	(United States) S Korda	2	6^{4}
Q	(Germany) P Torebko	6	7^{7}
(Argentina) F Bagnis	7^{9}	6
(Russia) I Nedelko	6^{7}	2
Alt	(New Zealand) R Statham	4	7	3
3	(Germany) Y Hanfmann	6	5	6
6/WC	(Argentina) R Olivo	6	6
(Spain) D Muñoz de la Nava	4	4
(Germany) D Köpfer	4	6	4
Q	(Colombia) C Rodríguez	6	4	6
(Argentina) A Collarini	3	6	7^{7}
(Argentina) F Argüello	6	1	6^{2}
Q	(United States) Evan Song	3	6	6
2	(Brazil) R Dutra Silva	6	4	4

Second round
(Slovenia) B Rola	6	6
Q	(Germany) P Torebko	3	2
(Argentina) F Bagnis	2	4
3	(Germany) Y Hanfmann	6	6
6/WC	(Argentina) R Olivo	3	6^{5}
Q	(Colombia) C Rodríguez	6	7^{7}
(Argentina) A Collarini	7^{7}	0
Q	(United States) E Song	6^{3}	0^{r}

Quarterfinals
(Slovenia) B Rola	3	6	6
3	(Germany) Y Hanfmann	6	4	4
Q	(Colombia) C Rodríguez	4	6^{7}
(Argentina) A Collarini	6	7^{9}

Semifinals
(Slovenia) B Rola	6	6
(Argentina) A Collarini	2	3
