= 2013 Visit Panamá Cup =

Professional tennis tournament

- Date: 15 – 21 April
- Edition: 2nd
- Draw: 32S / 16D
- Prize money: $35,000+H
- Surface: Clay
- Location: Panama City, Panama

Champions

Singles
- (Spain) Rubén Ramírez Hidalgo

Doubles
- (Chile) Jorge Aguilar / (Peru) Sergio Galdós
← 2012 ·	Visit Panamá Cup	· 2014 →

The 2013 Visit Panamá Cup was a professional tennis tournament played on clay courts. It was the second edition of the tournament which was part of the 2013 ATP Challenger Tour. It took place in Panama City, Panama between 15 and 21 April 2013.

== Singles main draw entrants ==
=== Seeds ===
Country	Player	Rank^{1}	Seed
ITA	Flavio Cipolla	107	1
ARG	Federico Delbonis	116	2
ESP	Rubén Ramírez Hidalgo	117	3
ESP	Daniel Muñoz de la Nava	129	4
FRA	Jonathan Dasnières de Veigy	147	5
ARG	Diego Sebastián Schwartzman	150	6
COL	Alejandro González	167	7
CHI	Jorge Aguilar	182	8

- ^{1} Rankings are as of April 8, 2013.

=== Other entrants ===
The following players received wildcards into the singles main draw:

- (Italy) Flavio Cipolla
- (Panama) Walner Espinoza
- (Chile) Nicolás Massú
- (United States) Jesse Witten

The following players received entry as a special exempt into the singles main draw:

- (France) Axel Michon

The following players received entry from the qualifying draw:

- (Ecuador) Iván Endara
- (Dominican Republic) Víctor Estrella
- (Austria) Gerald Melzer
- (Venezuela) Ricardo Rodríguez

The following player received entry as a lucky loser:

- (France) Florian Reynet

== Doubles main draw entrants ==
=== Seeds ===
Country	Player	Country	Player	Rank^{1}	Seed
AUT	Oliver Marach	GER	Frank Moser	126	1
ARG	Facundo Bagnis	ARG	Federico Delbonis	333	2
ARG	Renzo Olivo	ARG	Marco Trungelliti	334	3
BRA	Fabiano de Paula	ITA	Claudio Grassi	363	4

- ^{1} Rankings as of April 8, 2013.

=== Other entrants ===
The following pairs received wildcards into the doubles main draw:

- (United States) Sam Barnett / (Romania) Cătălin-Ionuț Gârd
- (Ecuador) Iván Endara / (Panama) Walner Espinoza
- (Chile) Nicolás Massú / (Chile) Guillermo Rivera Aránguiz

== Champions ==
=== Singles ===
- (Spain) Rubén Ramírez Hidalgo def. (Colombia) Alejandro González, 6–4, 5–7, 7–6^{(7–4)}

=== Doubles ===
- (Chile) Jorge Aguilar / (Peru) Sergio Galdós def. (Colombia) Alejandro González / (Ecuador) Julio César Campozano, 6–4, 6–4
