= 2013 Visit Panamá Cup – Singles =

Singles
- 2013 Visit Panamá Cup

Final
- Champion: (Spain) Rubén Ramírez Hidalgo
- Runner-up: (Colombia) Alejandro González
- Score: 6–4, 5–7, 7–6^{(7–4)}

Events
Singles	Doubles
← 2012 ·	Visit Panamá Cup	· 2014 →

Rogério Dutra da Silva was the defending champion but chose to compete in Campeonato Internacional de Tenis de Santos instead.
Rubén Ramírez Hidalgo won the final against Alejandro González 6–4, 5–7, 7–6^{(7–4)}.

== Seeds ==
1. (Italy) Flavio Cipolla (first round)
2. (Argentina) Federico Delbonis (second round)
3. (Spain) Rubén Ramírez Hidalgo (champion)
4. (Spain) Daniel Muñoz de la Nava (second round)
5. (France) Jonathan Dasnières de Veigy (first round)
6. (Argentina) Diego Sebastián Schwartzman (first round)
7. (Colombia) Alejandro González (final)
8. (Chile) Jorge Aguilar (quarterfinals)

== Draw ==
=== Key ===
- Q = Qualifier
- WC = Wild card
- LL = Lucky loser
- Alt = Alternate
- SE = Special exempt
- PR = Protected ranking
- ITF = ITF entry
- JE = Junior exempt
- w/o = Walkover
- r = Retired
- d = Defaulted
- SR = Special ranking

=== Finals ===
Semifinals
7	(Colombia) Alejandro González	6^{5}	6	6
Q	(Dominican Republic) Víctor Estrella	7^{7}	4	4
3	(Spain) Rubén Ramírez Hidalgo	6	6
Q	(Austria) Gerald Melzer	3	1

Final
7	(Colombia) Alejandro González	4	7	6^{4}
3	(Spain) Rubén Ramírez Hidalgo	6	5	7^{7}

=== Top half ===
First round
1/WC	(Italy) F Cipolla	2	6^{3}
(Portugal) P Sousa	6	7^{7}
Q	(Venezuela) R Rodríguez	6	3	3
(France) Laurent Rochette	4	6	6
(Ecuador) JC Campozano	6	6^{7}	7
WC	(Chile) N Massú	3	7^{9}	5
(Canada) P Polansky	6	3	3
7	(Colombia) A González	3	6	6
4	(Spain) D Muñoz de la Nava	6	0
(Brazil) F de Paula	0	0^{r}
(Argentina) F Bagnis	6	6
(Italy) R Ghedin	1	4
(Colombia) N Barrientos	6	6
(Georgia (country)) N Basilashvili	3	2
Q	(Dominican Republic) V Estrella	6	6
6	(Argentina) DS Schwartzman	3	2

Second round
(Portugal) P Sousa	1	6	6
(France) L Rochette	6	2	4
(Ecuador) JC Campozano	5	2
7	(Colombia) A González	7	6
4	(Spain) D Muñoz de la Nava	0	2
(Argentina) F Bagnis	6	6
(Colombia) N Barrientos	2	1
Q	(Dominican Republic) V Estrella	6	6

Quarterfinals
(Portugal) P Sousa	2	3
7	(Colombia) A González	6	6
(Argentina) F Bagnis	2	3
Q	(Dominican Republic) V Estrella	6	6

Semifinals
7	(Colombia) A González	6^{5}	6	6
Q	(Dominican Republic) V Estrella	7^{7}	4	4

=== Bottom half ===
First round
5	(France) J Dasnières de Veigy	4	6	2
(Belgium) A De Greef	6	1	6
SE	(France) A Michon	5	5
(Argentina) R Olivo	7	7
WC	(United States) J Witten	7^{7}	4	6
(Colombia) C Salamanca	6^{4}	6	2
LL	(France) Florian Reynet	4	4
3	(Spain) R Ramírez Hidalgo	6	6
8	(Chile) J Aguilar	6^{5}	6	7^{7}
(France) M Teixeira	7^{7}	0	6^{2}
Q	(Ecuador) I Endara	6^{6}	6^{9}
(Argentina) M Trungelliti	7^{8}	7^{11}
(Japan) T Daniel	2	2
Q	(Austria) G Melzer	6	6
WC	(Panama) Walner Espinoza	2	0
2	(Argentina) F Delbonis	6	6

Second round
(Belgium) A De Greef	1	0
(Argentina) R Olivo	6	6
WC	(United States) J Witten	3	6	1
3	(Spain) R Ramírez Hidalgo	6	3	6
8	(Chile) J Aguilar	6	1	7
(Argentina) M Trungelliti	4	6	5
Q	(Austria) G Melzer	4	6	7^{10}
2	(Argentina) F Delbonis	6	4	6^{8}

Quarterfinals
(Argentina) R Olivo	3	6	3
3	(Spain) R Ramírez Hidalgo	6	3	6
8	(Chile) J Aguilar	4	6	6^{4}
Q	(Austria) G Melzer	6	2	7^{7}

Semifinals
3	(Spain) R Ramírez Hidalgo	6	6
Q	(Austria) G Melzer	3	1
