= 2018 Visit Panamá Cup – Doubles =

Doubles
- 2018 Visit Panamá Cup

Final
- Champions: (Germany) Yannick Hanfmann (Germany) Kevin Krawietz
- Runners-up: (United States) Nathan Pasha (Ecuador) Roberto Quiroz
- Score: 7–6^{(7–4)}, 6–4

Events
Singles	Doubles
- Visit Panamá Cup

Sergio Galdós and Caio Zampieri were the defending champions but only Galdós chose to defend his title, partnering Franco Agamenone. Galdós lost in the quarterfinals to Cristian Rodríguez and Rubin Statham.

Yannick Hanfmann and Kevin Krawietz won the title after defeating Nathan Pasha and Roberto Quiroz 7–6^{(7–4)}, 6–4 in the final.

== Seeds ==
1. (Argentina) Franco Agamenone / (Peru) Sergio Galdós (quarterfinals)
2. (United States) Nathaniel Lammons / (United States) Alex Lawson (first round)
3. (United States) Nathan Pasha / (Ecuador) Roberto Quiroz (final)
4. (Mexico) Hans Hach Verdugo / (Venezuela) Luis David Martínez (quarterfinals)

== Draw ==
Key

- Q = Qualifier
- WC = Wild card
- LL = Lucky loser
- Alt = Alternate
- ITF = ITF entry
- PR = Protected ranking
- SR = Special ranking
- SE = Special exempt
- JE = Junior exempt
- JR = Junior Accelerator Programme entrant
- CO = College Accelerator Programme entrant
- NG = Next Gen Accelerator Program entrant
- w/o = Walkover
- r = Retired
- d = Defaulted

First round
1	(Argentina) F Agamenone (Peru) S Galdós	6	6
(Argentina) C Berlocq (Argentina) Matías Zukas	3	1
WC	(Ecuador) E Gómez (Dominican Republic) J Hernández-Fernández	3	2
(Colombia) C Rodríguez (New Zealand) R Statham	6	6
3	(United States) N Pasha (Ecuador) R Quiroz	6	6
(Venezuela) R Maytín (Spain) D Muñoz de la Nava	3	4
(Italy) A Basso (Italy) M Bortolotti	6^{2}	4
(Argentina) A Collarini (Argentina) JI Londero	7^{7}	6
(Croatia) A Pavić (Brazil) F Romboli	4	6^{6}
(Germany) Y Hanfmann (Germany) K Krawietz	6	7^{8}
(Argentina) F Coria (Argentina) R Olivo	3	4
4	(Mexico) H Hach Verdugo (Venezuela) LD Martínez	6	6
WC	(Panama) JG Gómez (Panama) L Gómez	3	1
WC	(United States) S Korda (Colombia) N Mejía	6	6
(Argentina) F Argüello (Argentina) F Bagnis	7	6
2	(United States) N Lammons (United States) A Lawson	5	3

Quarterfinals
1	(Argentina) F Agamenone (Peru) S Galdós	3	7^{7}	[10]
(Colombia) C Rodríguez (New Zealand) R Statham	6	6^{5}	[12]
3	(United States) N Pasha (Ecuador) R Quiroz	6	6
(Argentina) A Collarini (Argentina) JI Londero	3	2
(Germany) Y Hanfmann (Germany) K Krawietz	6	6
4	(Mexico) H Hach Verdugo (Venezuela) LD Martínez	2	3
WC	(United States) S Korda (Colombia) N Mejía	6	1	[10]
(Argentina) F Argüello (Argentina) F Bagnis	1	6	[8]

Semifinals
(Colombia) C Rodríguez (New Zealand) R Statham	6^{7}	6^{2}
3	(United States) N Pasha (Ecuador) R Quiroz	7^{9}	7^{7}
(Germany) Y Hanfmann (Germany) K Krawietz	6	6
WC	(United States) S Korda (Colombia) N Mejía	4	4

Final
3	(United States) N Pasha (Ecuador) R Quiroz	6^{4}	4
(Germany) Y Hanfmann (Germany) K Krawietz	7^{7}	6
