= 2017 Visit Panamá Cup – Singles =

Singles
- 2017 Visit Panamá Cup

Final
- Champion: (Brazil) Rogério Dutra Silva
- Runner-up: (Serbia) Peđa Krstin
- Score: 6–2, 6–4

Events
Singles	Doubles
- Visit Panamá Cup

Pere Riba was the defending champion but chose not to defend his title.

Rogério Dutra Silva won the title after defeating Peđa Krstin 6–2, 6–4 in the final.

== Seeds ==
1. (Argentina) Horacio Zeballos (quarterfinals)
2. (Brazil) Rogério Dutra Silva (champion)
3. (Dominican Republic) Víctor Estrella Burgos (semifinals)
4. (Argentina) Nicolás Kicker (first round)
5. (United States) Bjorn Fratangelo (quarterfinals)
6. (Switzerland) Henri Laaksonen (semifinals)
7. (United States) Stefan Kozlov (first round)
8. (Brazil) João Souza (first round)

== Draw ==
Key

- Q = Qualifier
- WC = Wild card
- LL = Lucky loser
- Alt = Alternate
- ITF = ITF entry
- PR = Protected ranking
- SR = Special ranking
- SE = Special exempt
- JE = Junior exempt
- JR = Junior Accelerator Programme entrant
- CO = College Accelerator Programme entrant
- NG = Next Gen Accelerator Program entrant
- w/o = Walkover
- r = Retired
- d = Defaulted

=== Finals ===
Semifinals
(Serbia) Peđa Krstin	7^{7}	6
6	(Switzerland) Henri Laaksonen	6^{5}	1
3	(Dominican Republic) Víctor Estrella Burgos	3	4
2	(Brazil) Rogério Dutra Silva	6	6

Final
(Serbia) Peđa Krstin	2	4
2	(Brazil) Rogério Dutra Silva	6	6

=== Top half ===
First round
1	(Argentina) H Zeballos	2	6	6
WC	(Serbia) M Kecmanović	6	4	2
(Dominican Republic) J Hernández-Fernández	6	6
Q	(Hungary) P Nagy	3	3
(Brazil) C Zampieri	4	4
(Serbia) P Krstin	6	6
(United States) S Bangoura	6	5	6
8	(Brazil) J Souza	4	7	2
4	(Argentina) N Kicker	3	1
(Germany) Y Hanfmann	6	6
(Argentina) F Coria	6	6
(Argentina) A Velotti	4	4
Q	(Argentina) T Lipovšek Puches	3	4
(Spain) A Menéndez Maceiras	6	6
(Serbia) M Zekić	0	2
6	(Switzerland) H Laaksonen	6	6

Second round
1	(Argentina) H Zeballos	6	7
(Dominican Republic) J Hernández-Fernández	3	5
(Serbia) P Krstin	6	7^{7}
(United States) S Bangoura	4	6^{2}
(Germany) Y Hanfmann	3	6	3
(Argentina) F Coria	6	4	6
(Spain) A Menéndez Maceiras	2	4
6	(Switzerland) H Laaksonen	6	6

Quarterfinals
1	(Argentina) H Zeballos	6^{4}	7	4
(Serbia) P Krstin	7^{7}	5	6
(Argentina) F Coria	3	3
6	(Switzerland) H Laaksonen	6	6

Semifinals
(Serbia) P Krstin	7^{7}	6
6	(Switzerland) H Laaksonen	6^{5}	1

=== Bottom half ===
First round
5/Q	(United States) B Fratangelo	6	6
Q	(Germany) K Krawietz	2	2
PR	(United States) B Klahn	2	5
(Italy) A Arnaboldi	6	7
WC	(Austria) O Marach	2	1
(Canada) S Diez	6	6
(Spain) R Ramírez Hidalgo	4	4
3	(Dominican Republic) V Estrella Burgos	6	6
7	(United States) S Kozlov	1	6^{6}
(Slovenia) B Rola	6	7^{8}
(United States) M Krueger	6	6
WC	(Argentina) Mateo Galdón	0	1
(Australia) C O'Connell	6^{4}	6	6^{3}
(United States) N Rubin	7^{7}	4	7^{7}
WC	(Panama) JG Gómez	1	0
2	(Brazil) R Dutra Silva	6	6

Second round
5/Q	(United States) B Fratangelo	5	6	7
(Italy) A Arnaboldi	7	4	5
(Canada) S Diez	6	4	3
3	(Dominican Republic) V Estrella Burgos	1	6	6
(Slovenia) B Rola	6	4	7^{7}
(United States) M Krueger	4	6	6^{5}
(United States) N Rubin	1	3
2	(Brazil) R Dutra Silva	6	6

Quarterfinals
5/Q	(United States) B Fratangelo	7^{8}	2	3
3	(Dominican Republic) V Estrella Burgos	6^{6}	6	6
(Slovenia) B Rola	7	4	4
2	(Brazil) R Dutra Silva	5	6	6

Semifinals
3	(Dominican Republic) V Estrella Burgos	3	4
2	(Brazil) R Dutra Silva	6	6
