= 2012 Visit Panamá Cup – Doubles =

Doubles
- 2012 Visit Panamá Cup

Final
- Champions: (Ecuador) Júlio César Campozano (Colombia) Alejandro González
- Runners-up: (United States) Daniel Kosakowski (Canada) Peter Polansky
- Score: 6–4, 7–5

Events
Singles	Doubles
- Visit Panamá Cup

Júlio César Campozano and Alejandro González won the first edition of the tournament, defeating Daniel Kosakowski and Peter Polansky 6–4, 7–5 in the final.

== Seeds ==
1. (Dominican Republic) Víctor Estrella / (Mexico) Daniel Garza (quarterfinals)
2. (United States) Vahid Mirzadeh / (United States) Maciek Sykut (semifinals)
3. (Brazil) Fabiano de Paula / (Brazil) Rogério Dutra da Silva (quarterfinals)
4. (Mexico) Luis Díaz-Barriga / (Argentina) Alejandro Fabbri (first round)

== Draw ==
Key

- Q = Qualifier
- WC = Wild card
- LL = Lucky loser
- Alt = Alternate
- ITF = ITF entry
- PR = Protected ranking
- SR = Special ranking
- SE = Special exempt
- JE = Junior exempt
- JR = Junior Accelerator Programme entrant
- CO = College Accelerator Programme entrant
- NG = Next Gen Accelerator Program entrant
- w/o = Walkover
- r = Retired
- d = Defaulted

=== Draw ===
First round
1	(Dominican Republic) V Estrella (Mexico) D Garza	6	6
(United States) R Kendrick (United States) J Witten	3	2
WC	(Panama) J-J Fuentes (Panama) J Silva	2	3
(Italy) Erik Crepaldi (Switzerland) L Margaroli	6	6
3	(Brazil) F de Paula (Brazil) R Dutra da Silva	6	6
(Argentina) Cristhian Benedetti (Dominican Republic) J Hernández	4	0
(Colombia) Tomas Builes (Colombia) Felipe Escobar	1	4
(Ecuador) JC Campozano (Colombia) A González	6	6
(Argentina) M Estévez (Brazil) B Sant'anna	6	6
WC	(Panama) W Espinoza (Panama) Jose Gomez	2	1
(United States) D Kosakowski (Canada) P Polansky	6	6
4	(Mexico) L Díaz-Barriga (Argentina) A Fabbri	4	4
(Guatemala) C Díaz Figueroa (Mexico) M Gallardo Valles	6	6
WC	(United States) Sam Barnett (United States) K Kim	4	2
(Barbados) D King (Haiti) O Sajous	3	3
2	(United States) V Mirzadeh (United States) M Sykut	6	6

Quarterfinals
1	(Dominican Republic) V Estrella (Mexico) D Garza	4	5
(Italy) Erik Crepaldi (Switzerland) L Margaroli	6	7
3	(Brazil) F de Paula (Brazil) R Dutra da Silva	1	0
(Ecuador) JC Campozano (Colombia) A González	6	6
(Argentina) M Estévez (Brazil) B Sant'anna	1	0
(United States) D Kosakowski (Canada) P Polansky	6	6
(Guatemala) C Díaz Figueroa (Mexico) M Gallardo Valles	5	6	[6]
2	(United States) V Mirzadeh (United States) M Sykut	7	3	[10]

Semifinals
(Italy) Erik Crepaldi (Switzerland) L Margaroli	4	5
(Ecuador) JC Campozano (Colombia) A González	6	7
(United States) D Kosakowski (Canada) P Polansky	4	6	[10]
2	(United States) V Mirzadeh (United States) M Sykut	6	4	[6]

Final
(Ecuador) JC Campozano (Colombia) A González	6	7
(United States) D Kosakowski (Canada) P Polansky	4	5
