= 2012 Visit Panamá Cup – Singles =

Singles
- 2012 Visit Panamá Cup

Final
- Champion: (Brazil) Rogério Dutra da Silva
- Runner-up: (Canada) Peter Polansky
- Score: 6–3, 6–0

Events
Singles	Doubles
- Visit Panamá Cup

Rogério Dutra da Silva won the first edition of the tournament against Peter Polansky 6–3, 6–0 in the final.

== Seeds ==
1. (United States) Michael Russell (first round)
2. (Brazil) Rogério Dutra da Silva (champion)
3. (Canada) Peter Polansky (final)
4. (Colombia) Carlos Salamanca (semifinals)
5. (Colombia) Alejandro González (second round)
6. (Dominican Republic) Víctor Estrella (quarterfinals)
7. (Colombia) Eduardo Struvay (first round)
8. (Ecuador) Julio César Campozano (quarterfinals)

== Draw ==
Key

- Q = Qualifier
- WC = Wild card
- LL = Lucky loser
- Alt = Alternate
- ITF = ITF entry
- PR = Protected ranking
- SR = Special ranking
- SE = Special exempt
- JE = Junior exempt
- JR = Junior Accelerator Programme entrant
- CO = College Accelerator Programme entrant
- NG = Next Gen Accelerator Program entrant
- w/o = Walkover
- r = Retired
- d = Defaulted

=== Finals ===
Semifinals
(United States) Jesse Witten
3	(Canada) Peter Polansky	w/o
4	(Colombia) Carlos Salamanca	3	1
2	(Brazil) Rogério Dutra da Silva	6	6

Final
3	(Canada) Peter Polansky	3	0
2	(Brazil) Rogério Dutra da Silva	6	6

=== Top half ===
First round
1	(United States) M Russell	6^{2}	2
(United States) D Kosakowski	7^{7}	6
WC	(Panama) W Espinoza	0	1
(United States) J Witten	6	6
Q	(United States) P Simmonds	6	6
Q	(Argentina) C Ignacio Benedetti	4	4
(Mexico) D Garza	2	2
6	(Dominican Republic) V Estrella	6	6
3	(Canada) P Polansky	7^{7}	5	6
(France) C Reix	6^{3}	7	4
(United States) M Sykut	4	3
(Guatemala) C Díaz Figueroa	6	6
WC	(Sweden) William Karlberg	4	1
(United States) K Kim	6	6
(Mexico) M Gallardo Valles	0	1
5	(Colombia) A González	6	6

Second round
(United States) D Kosakowski	3	2
(United States) J Witten	6	6
Q	(United States) P Simmonds	3	3
6	(Dominican Republic) V Estrella	6	6
3	(Canada) P Polansky	4	7	6
(Guatemala) C Díaz Figueroa	6	5	1
(United States) K Kim	1	6	6
5	(Colombia) A González	6	4	3

Quarterfinals
(United States) J Witten	6	2	6
6	(Dominican Republic) V Estrella	3	6	4
3	(Canada) P Polansky	7^{7}	6
(United States) K Kim	6^{4}	4

Semifinals
(United States) J Witten
3	(Canada) P Polansky	w/o

=== Bottom half ===
First round
7	(Colombia) E Struvay	6^{5}	4
(Mexico) L Díaz Barriga	7^{7}	6
Q	(Switzerland) L Margaroli	3	7^{7}	2
(Italy) Erik Crepaldi	6	6^{3}	6
(Argentina) M Estévez	6	6
(United States) V Mirzadeh	3	3
WC	(Chile) G Lama	3	6	0
4	(Colombia) C Salamanca	6	3	6
8	(Ecuador) JC Campozano	6	6
WC	(Chile) N Massú	2	3
(Haiti) O Sajous	6	2	7
(Brazil) B Sant'anna	3	6	5
(Brazil) F de Paula	6	6
Q	(Colombia) Felipe Escobar	4	2
(United States) R Kendrick	3	0^{r}
2	(Brazil) R Dutra da Silva	6	3

Second round
(Mexico) L Díaz Barriga	7^{7}	6
(Italy) Erik Crepaldi	6^{5}	3
(Argentina) M Estévez	6^{2}	0
4	(Colombia) C Salamanca	7^{7}	6
8	(Ecuador) JC Campozano	6	6
(Haiti) O Sajous	4	3
(Brazil) F de Paula	6^{2}	1
2	(Brazil) R Dutra da Silva	7^{7}	6

Quarterfinals
(Mexico) L Díaz Barriga	0	1
4	(Colombia) C Salamanca	6	6
8	(Ecuador) JC Campozano	3	2
2	(Brazil) R Dutra da Silva	6	6

Semifinals
4	(Colombia) C Salamanca	3	1
2	(Brazil) R Dutra da Silva	6	6
