= John Silva (tennis) =

Panamanian tennis player

- Country (sports): Panama
- Born: 13 February 1977 (age 48); Panama City, Panama
- Plays: Right-handed
- Prize money: $125

Singles
- Career record: 1–2 (at ATP Tour level, Grand Slam level, and in Davis Cup)
- Career titles: 0

Doubles
- Career record: 11–9 (at ATP Tour level, Grand Slam level, and in Davis Cup)
- Career titles: 0
- Last updated on: 3 April 2017.

John Silva (born 13 February 1977) is a Panamanian tennis player.

Silva makes appearances at the Visit Panamá Cup.

Silva represents Panama at the Davis Cup where he has a W/L record of 12–11.
