= Visit Panamá Cup =

Defunct tennis tournament
- Location: Panama City, Panama
- Venue: Centro de Alto Rendimiento Fred Maduro
- Category: ATP Challenger Tour
- Surface: Clay
- Draw: 32S/16Q/16D
- Prize money: $50,000+H

The Visit Panamá Cup was a tennis tournament held in Panama City, Panama from 2012-2014 and from 2017-2018. The event was part of the ATP Challenger Tour and was played on clay courts.

== Past finals ==
=== Singles ===
Year	Champion	Runner-up	Score
2012	(Brazil) Rogério Dutra Silva	(Canada) Peter Polansky	6–3, 6–0
2013	(Spain) Rubén Ramírez Hidalgo	(Colombia) Alejandro González	6–4, 5–7, 7–6^{(7–4)}
2014	(Spain) Pere Riba	(Slovenia) Blaž Rola	7–5, 5–7, 6–2
2015-2016	Not Held		
2017	(Brazil) Rogério Dutra Silva	(Serbia) Peđa Krstin	6–2, 6–4
2018	(Argentina) Carlos Berlocq	(Slovenia) Blaž Rola	6–2, 6–0

=== Doubles ===
Year	Champions	Runners-up	Score
2012	(Ecuador) Julio César Campozano (Colombia) Alejandro González	(United States) Daniel Kosakowski (Canada) Peter Polansky	6–4, 7–5
2013	(Chile) Jorge Aguilar (Peru) Sergio Galdós	(Ecuador) Julio César Campozano (Colombia) Alejandro González	6–4, 6–4
2014	(Czech Republic) František Čermák (Russia) Mikhail Elgin	(Argentina) Martín Alund (Argentina) Guillermo Durán	4–6, 6–3, [10–8]
2017	(Peru) Sergio Galdós (Brazil) Caio Zampieri	(Germany) Kevin Krawietz (Spain) Adrián Menéndez Maceiras	1–6, 7–6^{(7–5)}, [10–7]
2018	(Germany) Yannick Hanfmann (Germany) Kevin Krawietz	(United States) Nathan Pasha (Ecuador) Roberto Quiroz	7–6^{(7–4)}, 6–4
