= José Gilbert Gómez =

Panamanian tennis player

- Country (sports): Panama
- Born: 22 June 1991 (age 34)
- Prize money: $2,008

Singles
- Career record: 0–7 (at ATP Tour level, Grand Slam level, and in Davis Cup)
- Career titles: 0

Doubles
- Career record: 1–7 (at ATP Tour level, Grand Slam level, and in Davis Cup)
- Career titles: 0
- Highest ranking: No. 942 (16 June 2014)
- Last updated on: 12 May 2017.

José Gilbert Gómez (born 22 June 1991) is a Panamanian tennis player.

Gómez has a career high ATP doubles ranking of 942 achieved on 16 June 2014.

Gómez appeared in the 2017 Visit Panamá Cup as a wildcard.

Gómez represents Panama at the Davis Cup where he has a W/L record of 1–14.
