= 2012 Davis Cup Americas Zone Group III =

International tennis competition

The Americas Zone is one of the three zones of regional Davis Cup competition in 2012.

In the Americas Zone in 2012 there are three different groups in which teams compete against each other to advance to the next group, as Groups III and IV have been merged.

== Participating nations ==
- Aruba
- Bahamas
- Costa Rica
- Guatemala
- Haiti
- Honduras
- Jamaica
- Panama
- Trinidad and Tobago
- U.S. Virgin Islands

== Format ==
The teams were split into two groups, playing a round-robin, with the winner of each group playing the runner-up of the other group for promotion to Division II in 2013.

It was played in the week commencing 18 June 2012 at Tobago, Trinidad and Tobago and was played on outdoor hard court.

== Group A ==
Team	Pld	W	L	MF	MA	Pts
Guatemala	4	4	0	11	1	4
Haiti	4	3	1	10	2	3
Trinidad and Tobago	4	2	2	5	7	2
Honduras	4	1	3	3	9	1
Aruba	4	0	4	1	11	0

=== Guatemala vs. Haiti ===
Guatemala
2
Shaw Park Tennis Facility, Trinidad and Tobago
18 June 2012
hard (outdoor)

Haiti
1

			1	2	3
1	(Guatemala) (Haiti)	Julen Urigüen; Gonzales Austin	2; 6	6; 3	3; 6
2	(Guatemala) (Haiti)	Christopher Díaz Figueroa; Olivier Sajous	6; 4	3; 6	6; 2
3	(Guatemala) (Haiti)	Christopher Díaz Figueroa / Julen Urigüen; Joel Allen / Gonzales Austin	7; 5	7; 5

=== Trinidad and Tobago vs. Aruba ===
Trinidad and Tobago
3
Shaw Park Tennis Facility, Trinidad and Tobago
18 June 2011
hard (outdoor)

Aruba
0

			1	2	3
1	(Trinidad and Tobago) (Aruba)	Liam Gomez; Gian Hodgson	7; 5	7^{8} 6^{6}
2	(Trinidad and Tobago) (Aruba)	Yohansey Williams; Ibian Hodgson	6; 3	6; 2
3	(Trinidad and Tobago) (Aruba)	Luke de Caires / Vaughn Wilson; Mitchell de Jong / Gian Hodgson	6; 4	4; 6	6; 4

=== Aruba vs. Honduras ===
Aruba
1
Shaw Park Tennis Facility, Trinidad and Tobago
19 June 2011
hard (outdoor)

Honduras
2

			1	2	3
1	(Aruba) (Honduras)	Gian Hodgson; Alejandro Obando	7; 5	4; 6	6; 3
2	(Aruba) (Honduras)	Ibian Hodgson; Ricardo Pineda	5; 7	2; 6
3	(Aruba) (Honduras)	Mitchell de Jong / Gian Hodgson; Marco Ricardo Osorio / Keny Turcios	5; 7	6; 2	3; 6

=== Trinidad and Tobago vs. Guatemala ===
Trinidad and Tobago
0
Shaw Park Tennis Facility, Trinidad and Tobago
19 June 2012
hard (outdoor)

Guatemala
3

			1	2	3
1	(Trinidad and Tobago) (Guatemala)	Liam Gomez; Julen Urigüen	2; 6	0; 6
2	(Trinidad and Tobago) (Guatemala)	Yohansey Williams; Christopher Díaz Figueroa	3; 6	1; 6
3	(Trinidad and Tobago) (Guatemala)	Luke de Caires / Vaughn Wilson; Wilfredo González / Sebastien Vidal	3; 6	2; 6

=== Aruba vs. Haiti ===
Aruba
0
Shaw Park Tennis Facility, Trinidad and Tobago
20 June 2012
hard (outdoor)

Haiti
3

			1	2	3
1	(Aruba) (Haiti)	Gian Hodgson; Gonzales Austin	2; 6	1; 6
2	(Aruba) (Haiti)	Ibian Hodgson; Olivier Sajous	3; 6	6; 3	1; 6
3	(Aruba) (Haiti)	Mitchell de Jong / Gian Hodgson; Joel Allen / Olivier Sajous	4; 6	4; 6

=== Trinidad and Tobago vs. Honduras ===
Trinidad and Tobago
2
Shaw Park Tennis Facility, Trinidad and Tobago
20 June 2011
hard (outdoor)

Honduras
1

			1	2	3
1	(Trinidad and Tobago) (Honduras)	Liam Gomez; Alejandro Obando	4; 6	2; 6
2	(Trinidad and Tobago) (Honduras)	Vaughn Wilson; Ricardo Pineda	6; 3	6; 2
3	(Trinidad and Tobago) (Honduras)	Liam Gomez / Yohansey Williams; Marco Ricardo Osorio / Keny Turcios	6; 4	6; 2

=== Guatemala vs. Honduras ===
Guatemala
3
Shaw Park Tennis Facility, Trinidad and Tobago
21 June 2011
hard (outdoor)

Honduras
0

			1	2	3
1	(Guatemala) (Honduras)	Julen Urigüen; Keny Turcios	6; 0	7; 5
2	(Guatemala) (Honduras)	Christopher Díaz Figueroa; Alejandro Obando	6; 1	6; 2
3	(Guatemala) (Honduras)	Wilfredo González / Sebastien Vidal; Marco Ricardo Osorio / Ricardo Pineda	6; 1	6; 2

=== Trinidad and Tobago vs. Haiti ===
Trinidad and Tobago
0
Shaw Park Tennis Facility, Trinidad and Tobago
21 June 2011
hard (outdoor)

Haiti
3

			1	2	3
1	(Trinidad and Tobago) (Haiti)	Yohansey Williams; Gonzales Austin	3; 6	4; 6
2	(Trinidad and Tobago) (Haiti)	Vaughn Wilson; Olivier Sajous	2; 6	1; 6
3	(Trinidad and Tobago) (Haiti)	Liam Gomez / Yohansey Williams; Joel Allen / Olivier Sajous	2; 6	1; 6

=== Guatemala vs. Aruba ===
Guatemala
3
Shaw Park Tennis Facility, Trinidad and Tobago
22 June 2011
hard (outdoor)

Aruba
0

			1	2	3
1	(Guatemala) (Aruba)	Sebastien Vidal; Gian Hodgson	6; 4	6; 4
2	(Guatemala) (Aruba)	Christopher Díaz Figueroa; Ibian Hodgson	6; 0	6; 1
3	(Guatemala) (Aruba)	Wilfredo González / Julen Urigüen; Mitchell de Jong / Ibian Hodgson	6; 1	6; 2

=== Haiti vs. Honduras ===
Haiti
3
Shaw Park Tennis Facility, Trinidad and Tobago
22 June 2011
hard (outdoor)

Honduras
0

			1	2	3
1	(Haiti) (Honduras)	Gonzales Austin; Marco Ricardo Osorio	6; 3	6; 4
2	(Haiti) (Honduras)	Olivier Sajous; Alejandro Obando	6; 0	6; 0
3	(Haiti) (Honduras)	Gonzales Austin / Johann Coles; Ricardo Pineda / Keny Turcios	6; 2	7; 5

== Group B ==
Team	Pld	W	L	MF	MA	Pts
Bahamas	4	3	1	10	2	3
Costa Rica	4	3	1	8	4	3
Jamaica	4	3	1	8	4	3
Panama	4	1	3	4	8	1
U.S. Virgin Islands	4	0	4	0	12	0

=== Bahamas vs. U.S. Virgin Islands ===
Bahamas
3
Shaw Park Tennis Facility, Trinidad and Tobago
18 June 2012
hard (outdoor)

U.S. Virgin Islands
0

			1	2	3
1	(The Bahamas) (United States Virgin Islands)	Rodney Carey; Kristepher Elien	6; 2	6; 4
2	(The Bahamas) (United States Virgin Islands)	Marvin Rolle; Brian Oldfield	6; 3	6; 2
3	(The Bahamas) (United States Virgin Islands)	Rodney Carey / Marvin Rolle; Nicholas Bass / Alric Kevin Plaskett	6; 1	6; 4

=== Costa Rica vs. Jamaica ===
Costa Rica
2
Shaw Park Tennis Facility, Trinidad and Tobago
18 June 2012
hard (outdoor)

Jamaica
1

			1	2	3
1	(Costa Rica) (Jamaica)	Pablo Núñez; Dominic Pagon	6; 4	7; 5
2	(Costa Rica) (Jamaica)	Ignaci Roca; Brandon Burke	6; 3	6; 2
3	(Costa Rica) (Jamaica)	Pablo Núñez / Ignaci Roca; Brandon Burke / Dominic Pagon	0; 6	2; 6

=== Bahamas vs. Panama ===
Bahamas
3
Shaw Park Tennis Facility, Trinidad and Tobago
19 June 2012
hard (outdoor)

Panama
0

			1	2	3
1	(The Bahamas) (Panama)	Rodney Carey; Walner Espinoza	7^{7} 6^{3}	6; 1
2	(The Bahamas) (Panama)	Marvin Rolle; Luis Fernando García	6; 1	6; 0
3	(The Bahamas) (Panama)	Rodney Carey / Philip Wilbert Major; Juan José Fuentes / Luis Fernando García	6; 3	6; 4

=== Costa Rica vs. U.S. Virgin Islands ===
Costa Rica
3
Shaw Park Tennis Facility, Trinidad and Tobago
19 June 2012
hard (outdoor)

U.S. Virgin Islands
0

			1	2	3
1	(Costa Rica) (United States Virgin Islands)	Pablo Núñez; Nicholas Bass	6; 3	6; 2
2	(Costa Rica) (United States Virgin Islands)	Ignaci Roca; Brian Oldfield	6; 3	6; 0
3	(Costa Rica) (United States Virgin Islands)	Maurizio Feoli / Alan Reifer; Nicholas Bass / Alric Kevin Plaskett	6; 2	6; 1

=== Bahamas vs. Jamaica ===
Bahamas
1
Shaw Park Tennis Facility, Trinidad and Tobago
20 June 2012
hard (outdoor)

Jamaica
2

			1	2	3
1	(The Bahamas) (Jamaica)	Rodney Carey; Dominic Pagon	3; 6	6; 1	6^{5} 7^{7}
2	(The Bahamas) (Jamaica)	Marvin Rolle; Brandon Burke	6; 3	7; 5
3	(The Bahamas) (Jamaica)	Rodney Carey / Marvin Rolle; Brandon Burke / Dominic Pagon	3; 6	6; 1	3; 6

=== Panama vs. U.S. Virgin Islands ===
Panama
3
Shaw Park Tennis Facility, Trinidad and Tobago
20 June 2012
hard (outdoor)

U.S. Virgin Islands
0

			1	2	3
1	(Panama) (United States Virgin Islands)	Walner Espinoza; Nicholas Bass	6; 4	6; 2
2	(Panama) (United States Virgin Islands)	Luis Fernando García; Brian Oldfield	4; 6	6; 2	6; 3
3	(Panama) (United States Virgin Islands)	Juan José Fuentes / Luis Fernando García; Kristepher Elien / Alric Kevin Plaskett	7^{7} 6^{4}	6; 2

=== Costa Rica vs. Panama ===
Costa Rica
3
Shaw Park Tennis Facility, Trinidad and Tobago
21 June 2012
hard (outdoor)

Panama
0

			1	2	3
1	(Costa Rica) (Panama)	Pablo Núñez; Walner Espinoza	6; 3	6; 1
2	(Costa Rica) (Panama)	Ignaci Roca; Luis Fernando García	6; 4	7; 5
3	(Costa Rica) (Panama)	Maurizio Feoli / Alan Reifer; Walner Espinoza / José Gilbert Gómez	2; 6	6; 4	6; 4

=== Jamaica vs. U.S. Virgin Islands ===
Jamaica
3
Shaw Park Tennis Facility, Trinidad and Tobago
21 June 2012
hard (outdoor)

U.S. Virgin Islands
0

			1	2	3
1	(Jamaica) (United States Virgin Islands)	Dominic Pagon; Nicholas Bass	6; 0	6; 1
2	(Jamaica) (United States Virgin Islands)	Brandon Burke; Brian Oldfield	3; 6	6; 4	6; 2
3	(Jamaica) (United States Virgin Islands)	Dominic Pagon / Dwayne Pagon; Kristepher Elien / Alric Kevin Plaskett	7^{7} 6^{2}	6; 3

=== Costa Rica vs. Bahamas ===
Costa Rica
0
Shaw Park Tennis Facility, Trinidad and Tobago
22 June 2012
hard (outdoor)

Bahamas
3

			1	2	3
1	(Costa Rica) (The Bahamas)	Pablo Núñez; Rodney Carey	4; 6	6; 3	3; 6
2	(Costa Rica) (The Bahamas)	Ignaci Roca; Marvin Rolle	1; 6	2; 6
3	(Costa Rica) (The Bahamas)	Pablo Núñez / Ignaci Roca; Rodney Carey / Marvin Rolle	0; 6	2; 6

=== Jamaica vs. Panama ===
Jamaica
2
Shaw Park Tennis Facility, Trinidad and Tobago
22 June 2012
hard (outdoor)

Panama
1

			1	2	3
1	(Jamaica) (Panama)	Dominic Pagon; Walner Espinoza	4; 6	3; 6
2	(Jamaica) (Panama)	Brandon Burke; Luis Fernando García	6; 2	7^{7} 6^{2}
3	(Jamaica) (Panama)	Dominic Pagon / Brandon Burke; Walner Espinoza / Juan José Fuentes	6; 1	6; 1

== Promotion play-off ==
=== Guatemala vs. Costa Rica ===
Guatemala
2
Shaw Park Tennis Facility, Trinidad and Tobago
23 June 2012
hard (outdoor)

Costa Rica
0

			1	2	3
1	(Guatemala) (Costa Rica)	Julen Urigüen; Pablo Núñez	6; 3	6; 1
2	(Guatemala) (Costa Rica)	Christopher Díaz Figueroa; Ignaci Roca	6; 2	6; 1
3	(Guatemala) (Costa Rica)	Wilfredo González / Sebastien Vidal; Maurizio Feoli / Ignaci Roca				not played

=== Haiti vs. Bahamas ===
Haiti
2
Shaw Park Tennis Facility, Trinidad and Tobago
23 June 2012
hard (outdoor)

Bahamas
0

			1	2	3
1	(Haiti) (The Bahamas)	Gonzales Austin; Rodney Carey	6; 3	6; 0
2	(Haiti) (The Bahamas)	Olivier Sajous; Marvin Rolle	6; 1	7; 5
3	(Haiti) (The Bahamas)	Joel Allen / Olivier Sajous; Rodney Carey / Marvin Rolle				not played
