= 2023 Davis Cup Americas Zone Group IV =

Davis Cup competition in 2023

The Americas Zone was the unique zone within Group 4 of the regional Davis Cup competition in 2023. The zone's competition was held in round robin format in Tacarigua, Trinidad and Tobago from 31 July to 5 August 2023.

== Participating nations ==
- Antigua and Barbuda
- Aruba
- Cuba
- Guatemala
- Haiti
- Nicaragua
- Puerto Rico
- Trinidad and Tobago
- U.S. Virgin Islands

== Draw ==
Date: 31 July–5 August 2023

Location: National Raquets Sports Centre, Tacarigua, Trinidad and Tobago (Hard)

Format: Round-robin basis. One pool of four teams and one pool of five teams and nations will play each team once in their pool. Nations finishing in the top two of each pool will enter promotional play-offs, with the first of Pool A facing the second of Pool B and the first of Pool B facing the second of Pool A, and the two winners will be promoted to Americas Zone Group III in 2024.

=== Seeding ===
| Pot | Nation | Rank^{1} | Seed |
|---|---|---|---|
| 1 | Guatemala | | |
| 1 | Puerto Rico | | |
| 2 | Cuba | | |
| 2 | Trinidad and Tobago | | |
| 3 | U.S. Virgin Islands | | |
| 3 | Aruba | | |
| 4 | Antigua and Barbuda | | |
| 4 | Nicaragua | | |
| 4 | Haiti | | |

- ^{1}Davis Cup Rankings as of

=== Round Robin ===
==== Pool A ====
| | GUA | ATG | VIR | CUB | RR; W–L | Set; W–L | Game; W–L | Standings |
| Guatemala | | 2–1 | 2–1 | 3–0 | 3–0 | 7–2 (%) | – (%) | 1 |
| Antigua and Barbuda | 1–2 | | 2–1 | 2–1 | 2–1 | 5–4 (%) | – (%) | 2 |
| U.S. Virgin Islands | 1–2 | 1–2 | | 2–1 | 1–2 | 4–5 (%) | – (%) | 3 |
| Cuba | 0–3 | 1–2 | 1–2 | | 0–3 | 2–7 (%) | – (%) | 4 |

==== Pool B ====
| | PUR | NCA | ARU | HAI | TRI | RR; W–L | Set; W–L | Game; W–L | Standings |
| Puerto Rico | | 2–1 | 3–0 | 3–0 | 3–0 | 4–0 | 11–1 (%) | – (%) | 1 |
| Nicaragua | 1–2 | | 2–1 | 3–0 | 3–0 | 3–1 | 9–3 (%) | – (%) | 2 |
| Aruba | 0–3 | 1–2 | | 1–2 | 3–0 | 1–3 | 5–7 (%) | – (%) | 3 |
| Haiti | 0–3 | 0–3 | 2–1 | | 1–2 | 1–3 | 3–9 (%) | – (%) | 4 |
| Trinidad and Tobago | 0–3 | 0–3 | 0–3 | 2–1 | | 1–3 | 2–10 (%) | – (%) | 5 |

Standings are determined by: 1. number of wins; 2. number of matches; 3. in two-team ties, head-to-head records; 4. in three-team ties, (a) percentage of sets won (head-to-head records if two teams remain tied), then (b) percentage of games won (head-to-head records if two teams remain tied), then (c) Davis Cup rankings.

=== Playoffs ===
| Placing | A Team | Score | B Team |
|---|---|---|---|
| Promotional | Guatemala | 2–1 | Nicaragua |
| Promotional | Antigua and Barbuda | 0–2 | Puerto Rico |
| Fifth | U.S. Virgin Islands | 0–2 | Aruba |
| Seventh | Cuba | 2–1 | Haiti |

- Guatemala and Puerto Rico were promoted to 2024 Davis Cup Americas Zone Group III.

== Round Robin ==
=== Pool A ===
==== Guatemala vs. U.S. Virgin Islands ====
Guatemala
2
National Raquets Sports Centre, Tacarigua, Trinidad and Tobago
1 August 2023
Hard

U.S. Virgin Islands
1

| | | | 1 | 2 | 3 |
|---|---|---|---|---|---|
| 1 | (Guatemala) (United States Virgin Islands) | Rafael Botran Neutze; Tomas Del Olmo | 6; 3 | 6; 4 |
| 2 | (Guatemala) (United States Virgin Islands) | Kaeri Hernandez Mariona; Jan Neuburger Higby | 6; 2 | 6; 4 |
| 3 | (Guatemala) (United States Virgin Islands) | Juan Sebastian Dominguez Collado / Kris Alessandro Hernandez Mariona; Tomas Del Olmo / Jan Neuburger Higby | 4; 6 | 5; 7 |

==== Cuba vs. Antigua and Barbuda ====
Cuba
1
National Raquets Sports Centre, Tacarigua, Trinidad and Tobago
1 August 2023
Hard

Antigua and Barbuda
2

| | | | 1 | 2 | 3 |
|---|---|---|---|---|---|
| 1 | (Cuba) (Antigua and Barbuda) | Roiniel Galindo; Rodain Shaquan Monelle | 6; 2 | 6; 3 |
| 2 | (Cuba) (Antigua and Barbuda) | Dayron Zuniga; Jody Maginley | 1; 6 | 1; 6 |
| 3 | (Cuba) (Antigua and Barbuda) | Roiniel Galindo / Yoan Perez; Jody Maginley / Cordell Williams | 6; 3 | 3; 6 | 4; 6 |

==== Guatemala vs. Cuba ====
Guatemala
3
National Raquets Sports Centre, Tacarigua, Trinidad and Tobago
2 August 2023
Hard

Cuba
0

| | | | 1 | 2 | 3 |
|---|---|---|---|---|---|
| 1 | (Guatemala) (Cuba) | Kris Alessandro Hernandez Mariona; Roiniel Galindo | 6; 1 | 6; 2 |
| 2 | (Guatemala) (Cuba) | Juan Sebastian Dominguez Collado; Dayron Zuniga | 6; 2 | 6; 4 |
| 3 | (Guatemala) (Cuba) | Rafael Botran Neutze / Kaeri Hernandez Mariona; Roiniel Galindo / Yoan Perez | 4; 6 | 6; 2 | 7; 5 |

==== U.S. Virgin Islands vs. Antigua and Barbuda ====
U.S. Virgin Islands
1
National Raquets Sports Centre, Tacarigua, Trinidad and Tobago
2 August 2023
Hard

Antigua and Barbuda
2

| | | | 1 | 2 | 3 |
|---|---|---|---|---|---|
| 1 | (United States Virgin Islands) (Antigua and Barbuda) | Tomas Del Olmo; Ron Murraine | 6; 1 | 6; 0 |
| 2 | (United States Virgin Islands) (Antigua and Barbuda) | Jan Neuburger Higby; Jody Maginley | 3; 6 | 6^{5} 7^{7} |
| 3 | (United States Virgin Islands) (Antigua and Barbuda) | Tomas Del Olmo / Jan Neuburger Higby; Jody Maginley / Cordell Williams | 6^{3} 7^{7} | 3; 6 |

==== Guatemala vs. Antigua and Barbuda ====
Guatemala
2
National Raquets Sports Centre, Tacarigua, Trinidad and Tobago
4 August 2023
Hard

Antigua and Barbuda
1

| | | | 1 | 2 | 3 |
|---|---|---|---|---|---|
| 1 | (Guatemala) (Antigua and Barbuda) | Kris Alessandro Hernandez Mariona; Rodain Shaquan Monelle | 6; 2 | 6; 1 |
| 2 | (Guatemala) (Antigua and Barbuda) | Juan Sebastian Dominguez Collado; Jody Maginley | 5; 7 | 5; 7 |
| 3 | (Guatemala) (Antigua and Barbuda) | Rafael Botran Neutze / Kaeri Hernandez Mariona; Jody Maginley / Cordell Williams | 7; 5 | 7; 5 |

==== Cuba vs. U.S. Virgin Islands ====
Cuba
1
National Raquets Sports Centre, Tacarigua, Trinidad and Tobago
4 August 2023
Hard

U.S. Virgin Islands
2

| | | | 1 | 2 | 3 |
|---|---|---|---|---|---|
| 1 | (Cuba) (United States Virgin Islands) | Roiniel Galindo; Tomas Del Olmo | 1; 6 | 4; 6 |
| 2 | (Cuba) (United States Virgin Islands) | Dayron Zuniga; Jan Neuburger Higby | 1; 6 | 3; 6 |
| 3 | (Cuba) (United States Virgin Islands) | Yoan Perez / Yohan Michel Sanchez Tamayo; Imani Beharry / Finlay Miller | 3; 6 | 6; 4 | 6; 4 |

=== Pool B ===
==== Puerto Rico vs. Nicaragua ====
Puerto Rico
2
National Raquets Sports Centre, Tacarigua, Trinidad and Tobago
31 July 2023
Hard

Nicaragua
1

| | | | 1 | 2 | 3 |
|---|---|---|---|---|---|
| 1 | (Puerto Rico) (Nicaragua) | Marko Mesarovic; Francisco Bendana | 4; 6 | 4; 6 |
| 2 | (Puerto Rico) (Nicaragua) | Gabriel Evans; Alfredo Gallegos | 6; 0 | 6; 0 |
| 3 | (Puerto Rico) (Nicaragua) | Jake Fellows / Noah Hernandez; Andres Bendana / Francisco Bendana | 6; 1 | 6; 1 |

==== Trinidad and Tobago vs. Aruba ====
Trinidad and Tobago
0
National Raquets Sports Centre, Tacarigua, Trinidad and Tobago
31 July 2023
Hard

Aruba
3

| | | | 1 | 2 | 3 |
|---|---|---|---|---|---|
| 1 | (Trinidad and Tobago) (Aruba) | Nabeel Mohammed; Kyle Frankel | 1; 6 | 2; 6 |
| 2 | (Trinidad and Tobago) (Aruba) | Luca Shamsi; Patrick Sydow | 4; 6 | 4; 6 |
| 3 | (Trinidad and Tobago) (Aruba) | Akiel Duke / Nabeel Mohammed; Kyle Frankel / Frederick Sydow | 4; 6 | 4; 6 |

==== Trinidad and Tobago vs. Haiti ====
Trinidad and Tobago
2
National Raquets Sports Centre, Tacarigua, Trinidad and Tobago
1 August 2023
Hard

Haiti
1

| | | | 1 | 2 | 3 |
|---|---|---|---|---|---|
| 1 | (Trinidad and Tobago) (Haiti) | Luca Shamsi; Christopher Bogelin | 7; 5 | 6; 4 |
| 2 | (Trinidad and Tobago) (Haiti) | Ebolum Pastor Nwokolo; James Adler Germinal | 3; 6 | 0; 6 |
| 3 | (Trinidad and Tobago) (Haiti) | Akiel Duke / Nabeel Mohammed; Christopher Bogelin / James Adler Germinal | 1; 6 | 7^{7} 6^{5} | 6; 3 |

==== Aruba vs. Nicaragua ====
Aruba
1
National Raquets Sports Centre, Tacarigua, Trinidad and Tobago
1 August 2023
Hard

Nicaragua
2

| | | | 1 | 2 | 3 |
|---|---|---|---|---|---|
| 1 | (Aruba) (Nicaragua) | Kyle Frankel; Francisco Bendana | 6; 3 | 2; 6 | 6^{7} 7^{9} |
| 2 | (Aruba) (Nicaragua) | Patrick Sydow; Alfredo Gallegos | 6; 2 | 7^{7} 6^{3} |
| 3 | (Aruba) (Nicaragua) | Frederick Sydow / Patrick Sydow; Andres Bendana / Francisco Bendana | 3; 6 | 4; 6 |

==== Puerto Rico vs. Aruba ====
Puerto Rico
3
National Raquets Sports Centre, Tacarigua, Trinidad and Tobago
2 August 2023
Hard

Aruba
0

| | | | 1 | 2 | 3 |
|---|---|---|---|---|---|
| 1 | (Puerto Rico) (Aruba) | Jake Fellows; Frederick Sydow | 6; 2 | 6; 2 |
| 2 | (Puerto Rico) (Aruba) | Gabriel Evans; Patrick Sydow | 6; 1 | 6; 2 |
| 3 | (Puerto Rico) (Aruba) | Noah Hernandez / Marko Mesarovic; Kyle Frankel / Patrick Sydow | 6; 4 | 4; 6 | 6; 3 |

==== Nicaragua vs. Haiti ====
Nicaragua
3
National Raquets Sports Centre, Tacarigua, Trinidad and Tobago
2 August 2023
Hard

Haiti
0

| | | | 1 | 2 | 3 |
|---|---|---|---|---|---|
| 1 | (Nicaragua) (Haiti) | Francisco Bendana; Christopher Bogelin | 6; 0 | 6; 3 |
| 2 | (Nicaragua) (Haiti) | Alfredo Gallegos; James Adler Germinal | 6; 1 | 6; 4 |
| 3 | (Nicaragua) (Haiti) | Andres Bendana / Alfredo Gallegos; Jacquelyn Dominique Coicou / Gerce Jonathan Jean Baptiste | 7; 5 | 6; 3 |

==== Puerto Rico vs. Trinidad and Tobago ====
Puerto Rico
3
National Raquets Sports Centre, Tacarigua, Trinidad and Tobago
3 August 2023
Hard

Trinidad and Tobago
0

| | | | 1 | 2 | 3 |
|---|---|---|---|---|---|
| 1 | (Puerto Rico) (Trinidad and Tobago) | Jake Fellows; Luca Shamsi | 6; 2 | 6; 1 |
| 2 | (Puerto Rico) (Trinidad and Tobago) | Marko Mesarovic; Ebolum Pastor Nwokolo | 6; 2 | 6; 2 |
| 3 | (Puerto Rico) (Trinidad and Tobago) | Jake Fellows / Noah Hernandez; Akiel Duke / Nabeel Mohammed | 6; 4 | 6; 2 |

==== Aruba vs. Haiti ====
Aruba
1
National Raquets Sports Centre, Tacarigua, Trinidad and Tobago
3 August 2023
Hard

Haiti
2

| | | | 1 | 2 | 3 |
|---|---|---|---|---|---|
| 1 | (Aruba) (Haiti) | Noah Muyale; Jacquelyn Dominique Coicou | 0; 6 | 1; 6 |
| 2 | (Aruba) (Haiti) | Frederick Sydow; James Adler Germinal | 4; 6 | 4; 6 |
| 3 | (Aruba) (Haiti) | Kyle Frankel / Patrick Sydow; Jacquelyn Dominique Coicou / Gerce Jonathan Jean Baptiste | 6; 0 | 6; 1 |

==== Puerto Rico vs. Haiti ====
Puerto Rico
3
National Raquets Sports Centre, Tacarigua, Trinidad and Tobago
4 August 2023
Hard

Haiti
0

| | | | 1 | 2 | 3 |
|---|---|---|---|---|---|
| 1 | (Puerto Rico) (Haiti) | Noah Hernandez; Christopher Bogelin | 6; 4 | 6; 1 |
| 2 | (Puerto Rico) (Haiti) | Gabriel Evans; James Adler Germinal | 6; 2 | 6; 2 |
| 3 | (Puerto Rico) (Haiti) | Jake Fellows / Marko Mesarovic; Christopher Bogelin / Jacquelyn Dominique Coicou | 6; 3 | 6; 4 |

==== Trinidad and Tobago vs. Nicaragua ====
Trinidad and Tobago
0
National Raquets Sports Centre, Tacarigua, Trinidad and Tobago
4 August 2023
Hard

Nicaragua
3

| | | | 1 | 2 | 3 |
|---|---|---|---|---|---|
| 1 | (Trinidad and Tobago) (Nicaragua) | Nabeel Mohammed; Francisco Bendana | 2; 6 | 4; 6 |
| 2 | (Trinidad and Tobago) (Nicaragua) | Luca Shamsi; Alfredo Gallegos | 6^{5} 7^{7} | 6^{3} 7^{7} |
| 3 | (Trinidad and Tobago) (Nicaragua) | Akiel Duke / Nabeel Mohammed; Andres Bendana / Francisco Bendana | 6; 2 | 5; 7 | 2; 6 |

== Play-offs ==
=== Promotional play-offs ===
==== Guatemala vs. Nicaragua ====
Guatemala
2
National Raquets Sports Centre, Tacarigua, Trinidad and Tobago
5 August 2023
Hard

Nicaragua
1

| | | | 1 | 2 | 3 |
|---|---|---|---|---|---|
| 1 | (Guatemala) (Nicaragua) | Rafael Botran Neutze; Francisco Bendana | 0; 6 | 3; 6 |
| 2 | (Guatemala) (Nicaragua) | Kaeri Hernandez Mariona; Alfredo Gallegos | 6; 2 | 6; 0 |
| 3 | (Guatemala) (Nicaragua) | Rafael Botran Neutze / Juan Sebastian Dominguez Collado; Andres Bendana / Francisco Bendana | 6; 2 | 6; 1 |

==== Antigua and Barbuda vs. Puerto Rico ====
Antigua and Barbuda
0
National Raquets Sports Centre, Tacarigua, Trinidad and Tobago
5 August 2023
Hard

Puerto Rico
2

| | | | 1 | 2 | 3 |
|---|---|---|---|---|---|---|
| 1 | (Antigua and Barbuda) (Puerto Rico) | Cordell Williams; Marko Mesarovic | 0; 6 | 1; 6 |
| 2 | (Antigua and Barbuda) (Puerto Rico) | Jody Maginley; Gabriel Evans | 1; 6 | 3; 6 |
| 3 | (Antigua and Barbuda) (Puerto Rico) | Jody Maginley / Cordell Williams; Jake Fellows / Noah Hernandez | | | | not played |

=== Fifth place play-offs ===
==== U.S. Virgin Islands vs. Aruba ====
U.S. Virgin Islands
0
National Raquets Sports Centre, Tacarigua, Trinidad and Tobago
5 August 2023
Hard

Aruba
2

| | | | 1 | 2 | 3 |
|---|---|---|---|---|---|---|
| 1 | (United States Virgin Islands) (Aruba) | Tomas Del Olmo; Kyle Frankel | 2; 6 | 6; 2 | 3; 6 |
| 2 | (United States Virgin Islands) (Aruba) | Jan Neuburger Higby; Patrick Sydow | 6^{1} 7^{7} | 2; 6 |
| 3 | (United States Virgin Islands) (Aruba) | Tomas Del Olmo / Jan Neuburger Higby; Kyle Frankel / Patrick Sydow | | | | not played |

=== Seventh place play-offs ===
==== Cuba vs. Haiti ====
Cuba
2
National Raquets Sports Centre, Tacarigua, Trinidad and Tobago
5 August 2023
Hard

Haiti
1

| | | | 1 | 2 | 3 |
|---|---|---|---|---|---|
| 1 | (Cuba) (Haiti) | Roiniel Galindo; Jacquelyn Dominique Coicou | 7^{7} 6^{3} | 5; 7 | 2; 6 |
| 2 | (Cuba) (Haiti) | Dayron Zuniga; James Adler Germinal | 6; 4 | 6; 3 |
| 3 | (Cuba) (Haiti) | Yoan Perez / Dayron Zuniga; Christopher Bogelin / James Adler Germinal | 7; 5 | 6; 4 |

== Final placements ==
| Placing | Teams | |
| Promoted/First | Guatemala | Puerto Rico |
| Third | Antigua and Barbuda | Nicaragua |
| Fifth | Aruba | |
| Sixth | U.S. Virgin Islands | |
| Seventh | Cuba | |
| Eighth | Haiti | |
| Ninth | Trinidad and Tobago | |

- Guatemala and Puerto Rico were promoted to 2024 Davis Cup Americas Zone Group III.
