= 2013 Davis Cup Americas Zone Group II =

International tennis competition

The Americas Zone is one of the three zones of regional Davis Cup competition in 2013.

In the Americas Zone there are three different groups in which teams compete against each other to advance to the next group.

== Participating nations ==
Seeds:

1. Mexico
2. Peru
3. Venezuela
4. El Salvador

Remaining nations:

- Barbados
- Guatemala
- Haiti
- Puerto Rico

=== Draw ===
Play-offs
St. Michael, Barbados (hard)
Puerto Rico	1
Barbados	3
Guatemala City, Guatemala (hard)
Guatemala	4
Haiti	1

First Round
Humacao, Puerto Rico (hard)
1	Mexico	4
Puerto Rico	1
Santa Tecla, El Salvador (clay)
4	El Salvador	4
Barbados	1
San Juan de los Morros, Ven. (hard)
Guatemala	1
3	Venezuela	4
Lima, Peru (clay)
Haiti	0
2	Peru	5

Second Round
Ciudad Merliot, El Salvador (hard)
1	Mexico	2
4	El Salvador	3
Arequipa, Peru (clay)
3	Venezuela	4
2	Peru	1

Third Round
El Salvador
4	El Salvador	1
3	Venezuela	3

- Puerto Rico and Haiti relegated to Group III in 2014.
- Venezuela promoted to Group I in 2014.

== First round ==
=== Puerto Rico vs. Mexico ===
Puerto Rico
1
Palmas Athletic Club, Humacao, Puerto Rico
1–3 February 2013
hard (outdoor)

Mexico
4

			1	2	3	4	5
1	(Puerto Rico) (Mexico)	Alex Llompart; Miguel Ángel Reyes-Varela	6^{7} 7^{9}	3; 6	6^{4} 7^{7}
2	(Puerto Rico) (Mexico)	Christian Garay; Daniel Garza	2; 6	0; 6	3; 6
3	(Puerto Rico) (Mexico)	Gilberto Álvarez / Alex Llompart; Daniel Garza / Santiago González	4; 6	7^{7} 6^{4}	1; 6	6; 3	6; 8
4	(Puerto Rico) (Mexico)	Alex Llompart; Daniel Garza	5; 7	3; 6
5	(Puerto Rico) (Mexico)	Christian Garay; Lucas Gómez	6; 3	6; 4

=== El Salvador vs. Barbados ===
El Salvador
4
Maya Country Club, Santa Tecla, El Salvador
1–3 February 2013
clay (outdoor)

Barbados
1

			1	2	3	4	5
1	(El Salvador) (Barbados)	Rafael Arévalo; Darian King	6; 3	6^{1} 7^{7}	6; 2	6; 4
2	(El Salvador) (Barbados)	Marcelo Arévalo; Anthony Marshall	6; 1	6; 1	6; 1
3	(El Salvador) (Barbados)	Marcelo Arévalo / Rafael Arévalo; Darian King / Russell Moseley	2; 6	6; 3	6; 4	6; 2
4	(El Salvador) (Barbados)	Alejandro González; Darian King	1; 6	2; 6
5	(El Salvador) (Barbados)	Rafael Arévalo; Seanon Williams	6; 2	6; 2

=== Venezuela vs. Guatemala ===
Venezuela
4
Centro Nacional de Tenis, Caracas, Venezuela
1–3 February 2013
hard (outdoor)

Guatemala
1

			1	2	3	4	5
1	(Venezuela) (Guatemala)	David Souto; Sebastien Vidal	6; 2	6; 1	7^{7} 6^{5}
2	(Venezuela) (Guatemala)	Ricardo Rodríguez; Christopher Díaz Figueroa	6; 3	7; 5	3; 6	6; 1
3	(Venezuela) (Guatemala)	Luis David Martínez / David Souto; Christopher Díaz Figueroa / Sebastien Vidal	7; 5	7; 5	6; 4
4	(Venezuela) (Guatemala)	Piero Luisi; Christopher Díaz Figueroa	3; 6	6^{6} 7^{8}
5	(Venezuela) (Guatemala)	Ricardo Rodríguez; Andrés Bucaro	6; 4	6; 3

=== Peru vs. Haiti ===
Peru
5
Club Lawn Tennis de la Exposicion, Lima, Peru
1–3 February 2013
clay (outdoor)

Haiti
0

			1	2	3	4	5
1	(Peru) (Haiti)	Duilio Beretta; Hillel Rousseau	6; 2	6; 2	6; 0
2	(Peru) (Haiti)	Mauricio Echazú; Olivier Sajous	6; 4	6; 3	7; 5
3	(Peru) (Haiti)	Duilio Beretta / Sergio Galdós; Joel Allen / Olivier Sajous	7^{7} 6^{5}	6; 4	6; 4
4	(Peru) (Haiti)	Sergio Galdós; Olivier Sajous	6; 2	3; 6	6; 3
5	(Peru) (Haiti)	Jorge Panta Herreros; Hillel Rousseau	6; 1	6; 0

== Second round ==
=== El Salvador vs. Mexico ===
El Salvador
3
Federación Salvadoreña de Tenis, Ciudad Merliot, El Salvador
5–7 April 2013
hard (outdoor)

Mexico
2

			1	2	3	4	5
1	(El Salvador) (Mexico)	Marcelo Arévalo; Daniel Garza	6; 4	6; 4	6^{7} 7^{9}	6; 2
2	(El Salvador) (Mexico)	Rafael Arévalo; Miguel Gallardo Valles	6; 2	6; 3	7; 5
3	(El Salvador) (Mexico)	Marcelo Arévalo / Rafael Arévalo; Daniel Garza / Miguel Ángel Reyes-Varela	6^{4} 7^{7}	6; 4	4; 6	6; 2	6; 2
4	(El Salvador) (Mexico)	Alejandro González; Miguel Gallardo Valles	0; 6	3; 6
5	(El Salvador) (Mexico)	Andrés Weisskopf; Rogelio Siller	2; 6	4; 6

=== Peru vs. Venezuela ===
Peru
1
Estadio Alejandro Olmedo, Arequipa, Peru
5–7 April 2013
clay (outdoor)

Venezuela
4

			1	2	3	4	5
1	(Peru) (Venezuela)	Duilio Beretta; Ricardo Rodríguez	5; 7	2; 6	2; 6
2	(Peru) (Venezuela)	Mauricio Echazú; David Souto	6; 4	2; 6	4; 6	5; 7
3	(Peru) (Venezuela)	Duilio Beretta / Sergio Galdós; Luis Martínez / David Souto	3; 6	7^{7} 6^{3}	3; 6	6^{5} 7^{7}
4	(Peru) (Venezuela)	Jorge Brian Panta; Luis Martínez	6; 3	6^{4} 7^{7}	3; 6
5	(Peru) (Venezuela)	Mauricio Echazú; Piero Luisi	6; 2	7; 5

== Play-offs ==
=== Barbados vs. Puerto Rico ===
Barbados
3
National Tennis Centre, St. Michael, Barbados
5–7 April 2013
hard (outdoor)

Puerto Rico
1

			1	2	3	4	5
1	(Barbados) (Puerto Rico)	Darian King; Christian Garay	6; 2	6; 1	6; 0
2	(Barbados) (Puerto Rico)	Seanon Williams; Alex Llompart	2; 6	3; 6	1; 6
3	(Barbados) (Puerto Rico)	Darian King / Haydn Lewis; Gilberto Álvarez / Alex Llompart	6; 3	6; 4	6; 1
4	(Barbados) (Puerto Rico)	Darian King; Alex Llompart	5; 7	6; 3	6; 4	6; 3
5	(Barbados) (Puerto Rico)	Haydn Lewis; Christian Garay						not played

=== Guatemala vs. Haiti ===
Guatemala
4
Centre Court, Guatemala City, Guatemala
5–7 April 2013
hard (outdoor)

Haiti
1

			1	2	3	4	5
1	(Guatemala) (Haiti)	Christopher Díaz Figueroa; Hillel Rousseau	6; 3	6; 1	6; 1
2	(Guatemala) (Haiti)	Sebastien Vidal; Oliver Sajous	6^{5} 7^{7}	5; 7	1; 6
3	(Guatemala) (Haiti)	Christopher Díaz Figueroa / Sebastien Vidal; Joel Allen / Oliver Sajous	6; 3	6^{5} 7^{7}	4; 6	6; 3	6; 4
4	(Guatemala) (Haiti)	Christopher Díaz Figueroa; Oliver Sajous	6; 2	6; 1	6; 4
5	(Guatemala) (Haiti)	Luciano Ramazzini; Hillel Rousseau	6; 0	6; 1

== Third round ==
=== El Salvador vs. Venezuela ===
El Salvador
1
Federacion Salvadoreña de Tenis, Ciudad Merliot, El Salvador
13–15 September 2013
hard (outdoor)

Venezuela
3

			1	2	3	4	5
1	(El Salvador) (Venezuela)	Rafael Arévalo; David Souto	5; 7	6; 3	7^{7} 6^{3}	6; 1
2	(El Salvador) (Venezuela)	Marcelo Arévalo; Ricardo Rodríguez	6; 1	6^{4} 7^{7}	2; 6	4; 6
3	(El Salvador) (Venezuela)	Marcelo Arévalo / Rafael Arévalo; Luis Martínez / Roberto Maytín	6^{2} 7^{7}	6; 3	5; 7	6; 2	2; 6
4	(El Salvador) (Venezuela)	Marcelo Arévalo; David Souto	7^{7} 6^{3}	3; 6	6^{3} 7^{7}	3; 6
5	(El Salvador) (Venezuela)	Rafael Arévalo; Ricardo Rodríguez						not played
