= 2011 Davis Cup Americas Zone Group III =

International tennis competition

The Americas Zone is one of the three zones of regional Davis Cup competition in 2011.

In the Americas Zone there are four different groups in which teams compete against each other to advance to the next group.

The Division III tournament was held in the Week commencing 13 June 2011 at Santa Cruz, Bolivia

== Format ==
The eight teams were split into two groups and played in a round-robin format. The top two teams of each group advanced to the promotion pool, where the two top teams will be promoted to the Americas Zone Group II in 2012. The last two placed teams of each group from the preliminary round were relegated into the relegation pool, where the two bottom teams will be relegated to the Americas Zone Group IV in 2012.

It was played on 15–18 June 2011 at the Club de Tenis Santa Cruz in Santa Cruz, Bolivia on outdoor clay courts.

== Group A ==
Team	Pld	W	L	MF	MA	Pts
Guatemala	3	3	0	9	0	3
Costa Rica	3	2	1	5	4	2
Jamaica	3	1	2	2	7	1
Honduras	3	0	3	2	7	0

=== Guatemala vs. Honduras ===
Guatemala
3
Club de Tenis Santa Cruz, Santa Cruz, Bolivia
15 June 2011
clay (outdoor)

Honduras
0

			1	2	3
1	(Guatemala) (Honduras)	Julen Urigüen; Keny Turcios	6; 2	6; 2
2	(Guatemala) (Honduras)	Christopher Díaz Figueroa; Alejandro Obando	6; 3	6; 0
3	(Guatemala) (Honduras)	Wilfredo González / Sebastien Vidal; Ricardo Lau Cooper / Ricardo Pineda	6; 4	6; 1

=== Costa Rica vs. Jamaica ===
Costa Rica
3
Club de Tenis Santa Cruz, Santa Cruz, Bolivia
15 June 2011
clay (outdoor)

Jamaica
0

			1	2	3
1	(Costa Rica) (Jamaica)	Pablo Núñez; Dwayne Pagon	6; 4	7; 6
2	(Costa Rica) (Jamaica)	Ignaci Roca; Brandon Burke	6; 4	6; 4
3	(Costa Rica) (Jamaica)	Pablo Núñez / Ignaci Roca; Brandon Burke / Macoy Malcolm	6; 2	6; 2

=== Guatemala vs. Jamaica ===
Guatemala
3
Club de Tenis Santa Cruz, Santa Cruz, Bolivia
16 June 2011
clay (outdoor)

Jamaica
0

			1	2	3
1	(Guatemala) (Jamaica)	Julen Urigüen; Macoy Malcolm	6; 1	6; 1
2	(Guatemala) (Jamaica)	Christopher Díaz Figueroa; Brandon Burke	6; 1	6; 3
3	(Guatemala) (Jamaica)	Wilfredo González / Sebastien Vidal; Atton Burrell / Dwayne Pagon	6; 0	6; 2

=== Costa Rica vs. Honduras ===
Costa Rica
2
Club de Tenis Santa Cruz, Santa Cruz, Bolivia
16 June 2011
clay (outdoor)

Honduras
1

			1	2	3
1	(Costa Rica) (Honduras)	Pablo Núñez; Keny Turcios	1; 6	6; 7
2	(Costa Rica) (Honduras)	Ignaci Roca; Alejandro Obando	6; 3	6; 2
3	(Costa Rica) (Honduras)	Pablo Núñez / Ignaci Roca; Ricardo Pineda / Keny Turcios	7; 6	6; 3

=== Guatemala vs. Costa Rica ===
Guatemala
3
Club de Tenis Santa Cruz, Santa Cruz, Bolivia
17 June 2011
clay (outdoor)

Costa Rica
0

			1	2	3
1	(Guatemala) (Costa Rica)	Julen Urigüen; Pablo Núñez	6; 1	6; 3
2	(Guatemala) (Costa Rica)	Christopher Díaz Figueroa; Ignaci Roca	6; 0	6; 1
3	(Guatemala) (Costa Rica)	Christopher Díaz Figueroa / Julen Urigüen; Pablo Núñez / Ignaci Roca	6; 2	4; 6	6; 1

=== Jamaica vs. Honduras ===
Jamaica
2
Club de Tenis Santa Cruz, Santa Cruz, Bolivia
17 June 2011
clay (outdoor)

Honduras
1

			1	2	3
1	(Jamaica) (Honduras)	Dwayne Pagon; Ricardo Lau Cooper	6; 4	1; 6	1; 6
2	(Jamaica) (Honduras)	Brandon Burke; Keny Turcios	2; 6	6; 4	6; 3
3	(Jamaica) (Honduras)	Brandon Burke / Macoy Malcolm; Alejandro Obando / Ricardo Pineda	6; 1	7; 6

== Group B ==
Team	Pld	W	L	MF	MA	Pts
Barbados	3	3	0	7	2	3
Bolivia	3	2	1	7	2	2
Bahamas	3	1	2	4	5	1
Aruba	3	0	3	0	9	0

=== Bahamas vs. Aruba ===
Bahamas
3
Club de Tenis Santa Cruz, Santa Cruz, Bolivia
15 June 2011
clay (outdoor)

Aruba
0

			1	2	3
1	(The Bahamas) (Aruba)	Devin Mullings; Gian Hodgson	6; 4	6; 0
2	(The Bahamas) (Aruba)	Marvin Rolle; Ibian Hodgson	6; 3	6; 2
3	(The Bahamas) (Aruba)	Jamaal Adderley / Marvin Rolle; Mitchell de Jong / Gian Hodgson	6; 1	7; 6

=== Bolivia vs. Barbados ===
Bolivia
1
Club de Tenis Santa Cruz, Santa Cruz, Bolivia
15 June 2011
clay (outdoor)

Barbados
2

			1	2	3
1	(Bolivia) (Barbados)	Mauricio Doria-Medina; Haydn Lewis	3; 6	4; 6
2	(Bolivia) (Barbados)	Federico Zeballos; Darian King	6; 4	3; 6	4; 6
3	(Bolivia) (Barbados)	Mauricio Doria-Medina / Federico Zeballos; Anthony Marshall / Seannon Williams	6; 2	6; 1

=== Bolivia vs. Bahamas ===
Bolivia
3
Club de Tenis Santa Cruz, Santa Cruz, Bolivia
16 June 2011
clay (outdoor)

Bahamas
0

			1	2	3
1	(Bolivia) (The Bahamas)	Mauricio Doria-Medina; Devin Mullings	6; 3	6; 4
2	(Bolivia) (The Bahamas)	Federico Zeballos; Marvin Rolle	6; 4	6; 1
3	(Bolivia) (The Bahamas)	Mauricio Doria-Medina / Federico Zeballos; Jamaal Adderley / Marvin Rolle	6; 3	6; 2

=== Barbados vs. Aruba ===
Barbados
3
Club de Tenis Santa Cruz, Santa Cruz, Bolivia
16 June 2011
clay (outdoor)

Aruba
0

			1	2	3
1	(Barbados) (Aruba)	Haydn Lewis; Gian Hodgson	6; 2	6; 2
2	(Barbados) (Aruba)	Darian King; Ibian Hodgson	6; 1	6; 3
3	(Barbados) (Aruba)	Haydn Lewis / Darian King; Mitchell de Jong / Gian Hodgson	6; 0	6; 1

=== Bahamas vs. Barbados ===
Bahamas
1
Club de Tenis Santa Cruz, Santa Cruz, Bolivia
17 June 2011
clay (outdoor)

Barbados
2

			1	2	3
1	(The Bahamas) (Barbados)	Devin Mullings; Haydn Lewis	3; 6	6; 7
2	(The Bahamas) (Barbados)	Marvin Rolle; Darian King	2; 6	1; 6
3	(The Bahamas) (Barbados)	Jamaal Adderley / Timothy Neilly; Anthony Marshall / Seannon Williams	6; 3	6; 4

=== Bolivia vs. Aruba ===
Bolivia
3
Club de Tenis Santa Cruz, Santa Cruz, Bolivia
17 June 2011
clay (outdoor)

Aruba
0

			1	2	3
1	(Bolivia) (Aruba)	Mauricio Doria-Medina; Gian Hodgson	6; 1	6; 0
2	(Bolivia) (Aruba)	Federico Zeballos; Mitchell de Jong	6; 2	6; 1
3	(Bolivia) (Aruba)	Boris Arias / Hugo Dellien; Mitchell de Jong / Gian Hodgson	6; 2	6; 3

== Promotion pool ==
Results and points from games against the opponent from the preliminary round were carried forward.

Team	Pld	W	L	MF	MA	Pts
Bolivia	3	2	1	6	3	2
Barbados	3	2	1	6	3	2
Guatemala	3	2	1	6	3	2
Costa Rica	3	0	3	0	9	0

=== Guatemala vs. Bolivia ===
Bolivia
2
Club de Tenis Santa Cruz, Santa Cruz, Bolivia
18 June 2011
clay (outdoor)

Guatemala
1

			1	2	3
1	(Bolivia) (Guatemala)	Hugo Dellien; Julen Urigüen	6; 4	6; 7	6; 3
2	(Bolivia) (Guatemala)	Federico Zeballos; Christopher Díaz Figueroa	4; 6	5; 7
3	(Bolivia) (Guatemala)	Mauricio Doria-Medina / Federico Zeballos; Wilfredo González / Sebastien Vidal	6; 1	6; 1

=== Costa Rica vs. Barbados ===
Costa Rica
0
Club de Tenis Santa Cruz, Santa Cruz, Bolivia
18 June 2011
clay (outdoor)

Barbados
3

			1	2	3
1	(Costa Rica) (Barbados)	Pablo Núñez; Haydn Lewis	0; 6	2; 6
2	(Costa Rica) (Barbados)	Ignaci Roca; Darian King	3; 6	2; 6
3	(Costa Rica) (Barbados)	Ignaci Roca / Martin Echandi; Darian King / Haydn Lewis	4; 6	5; 7

=== Guatemala vs. Barbados ===
Guatemala
2
Club de Tenis Santa Cruz, Santa Cruz, Bolivia
19 June 2011
clay (outdoor)

Barbados
1

			1	2	3
1	(Guatemala) (Barbados)	Julen Urigüen; Haydn Lewis	0; 6	3; 6
2	(Guatemala) (Barbados)	Christopher Diaz-Figueroa; Darian King	6; 4	1; 6	6; 4
3	(Guatemala) (Barbados)	Christopher Diaz-Figueroa / Julen Urigüen; Darian King / Haydn Lewis	7; 6	4; 6	6; 4

=== Bolivia vs. Costa Rica ===
Bolivia
3
Club de Tenis Santa Cruz, Santa Cruz, Bolivia
19 June 2011
clay (outdoor)

Costa Rica
0

			1	2	3
1	(Bolivia) (Costa Rica)	Hugo Dellien; Pablo Núñez	6; 1	6; 4
2	(Bolivia) (Costa Rica)	Mauricio Doria-Medina; Ignaci Roca	6; 0	6; 3
3	(Bolivia) (Costa Rica)	Mauricio Doria-Medina / Federico Zeballos; Pablo Núñez / Ignaci Roca	6; 2	6; 1

== Relegation pool ==
Results and points from games against the opponent from the preliminary round were carried forward.

Team	Pld	W	L	MF	MA	Pts
Bahamas	3	3	0	8	1	3
Aruba	3	2	1	4	5	2
Jamaica	3	1	2	3	6	1
Honduras	3	0	3	3	6	0

=== Jamaica vs. Aruba ===
Jamaica
1
Club de Tenis Santa Cruz, Santa Cruz, Bolivia
18 June 2011
clay (outdoor)

Aruba
2

			1	2	3
1	(Jamaica) (Aruba)	Macoy Malcolm; Gian Hodgson	4; 6	4; 6
2	(Jamaica) (Aruba)	Brandon Burke; Mitchell de Jong	4; 6	6; 3	6; 1
3	(Jamaica) (Aruba)	Brandon Burke / Macoy Malcolm; Mitchell de Jong / Gian Hodgson	1; 6	6; 3	4; 6

=== Honduras vs. Bahamas ===
Honduras
1
Club de Tenis Santa Cruz, Santa Cruz, Bolivia
18 June 2011
clay (outdoor)

Bahamas
2

			1	2	3
1	(Honduras) (The Bahamas)	Ricardo Pineda; Devin Mullings	2; 6	2; 6
2	(Honduras) (The Bahamas)	Ricardo Lau Cooper; Marvin Rolle	7; 5	6; 2
3	(Honduras) (The Bahamas)	Alejandro Obando / Keny Turcios; Jamaal Adderley / Marvin Rolle	3; 6	1; 6

=== Jamaica vs. Bahamas ===
Jamaica
0
Club de Tenis Santa Cruz, Santa Cruz, Bolivia
19 June 2011
clay (outdoor)

Bahamas
3

			1	2	3
1	(Jamaica) (The Bahamas)	Atton Burrell; Timothy Neilly	2; 6	0; 6
2	(Jamaica) (The Bahamas)	Macoy Malcolm; Devin Mullings	0; 6	0; 6
3	(Jamaica) (The Bahamas)	Brandon Burke / Atton Burrell; Jamaal Adderley / Devin Mullings	1; 6	0; 6

=== Honduras vs. Aruba ===
Honduras
1
Club de Tenis Santa Cruz, Santa Cruz, Bolivia
19 June 2011
clay (outdoor)

Aruba
2

			1	2	3
1	(Honduras) (Aruba)	Ricardo Lau Cooper; Gian Hodgson	6; 2	2; 6	6; 7
2	(Honduras) (Aruba)	Keny Turcios; Ibian Hodgson	4; 6	6; 3	6; 2
3	(Honduras) (Aruba)	Ricardo Pineda / Keny Turcios; Mitchell de Jong / Gian Hodgson	3; 6	4; 6

== Final standings ==
Rank	Team
1	Bolivia
2	Barbados
3	Guatemala
4	Costa Rica
5	Bahamas
6	Aruba
7	Jamaica
8	Honduras

- Bolivia and Barbados promoted to Group II in 2012.
- Jamaica and Honduras finished in the relegation places. However, in 2012 Groups III and IV were merged, so no demotion occurred.
