= 2021 Davis Cup Americas Zone Group III =

Davis Cup competition in 2021

The Americas Zone was the unique zone within Group 3 of the regional Davis Cup competition in 2021. The zone's competition was held in round robin format in Panama City, Panama, from 30 June to 3 July 2021.

== Participating nations ==
- Bahamas
- Bermuda
- Costa Rica
- Cuba
- Guatemala
- Honduras
- Jamaica
- Panama
- Puerto Rico
- Trinidad and Tobago
- U.S. Virgin Islands

=== Inactive nations ===
- Antigua and Barbuda
- Aruba
- Haiti
- Saint Lucia

== Draw ==
Date: 30 June–3 July 2021

Location: Centro de Alto Rendimiento Fred Maduro, Panama City, Panama (clay)

Format: Round-robin basis. Two pools of four teams and one pool of three teams. Nations finishing top of their group, as well as the best second-placed nation, will play-off for promotion to the World Group II Play-offs in 2022.

=== Seeding ===
Pot	Nation	Rank^{1}	Seed
1	Guatemala	72	1
1	Costa Rica	73	2
1	Jamaica	75	3
2	Puerto Rico	76	4
2	Honduras	79	5
2	Cuba	86	6
3	Panama	87	7
3	Bahamas	89	8
3	Bermuda	95	9
3	U.S. Virgin Islands	100	10
3	Trinidad and Tobago	100	11

- ^{1}Davis Cup Rankings as of 8 March 2021

=== Round Robin ===
==== Pool A ====
		BAH	GUA	CUB	RR; W–L	Set; W–L	Game; W–L	Standings
8	Bahamas		2–1	2–1	4–2	9–6 (60%)	73–64 (53%)	1
1	Guatemala	1–2		3–0	4–2	9–5 (64%)	73–64 (53%)	2
6	Cuba	1–2	0–3		1–5	4–11 (27%)	68–86 (44%)	3

==== Pool B ====
		CRC	BER	HON	TTO	RR; W–L	Set; W–L	Game; W–L	Standings
2	Costa Rica		2–1	3–0	3–0	8–1	17–4 (81%)	119–62 (66%)	1
9	Bermuda	1-2		2–1	3–0	6–3	12–7 (63%)	97–80 (55%)	2
5	Honduras	0–3	1–2		2–1	3–6	7–12 (37%)	70–86 (45%)	3
11	Trinidad and Tobago	0–3	0–3	1–2		1–8	3–16 (16%)	51–109 (32%)	4

==== Pool C ====
		JAM	PUR	PAN	ISV	RR; W–L	Set; W–L	Game; W–L	Standings
3	Jamaica		2–1	3–0	3–0	8–1	16–2 (89%)	100–51 (66%)	1
4	Puerto Rico	1–2		2–1	3–0	6–3	13–7 (65%)	100–72 (58%)	2
7	Panama	0–3	1–2		3–0	4–5	9–12 (43%)	89–100 (47%)	3
10	U.S. Virgin Islands	0–3	0–3	0–3		0–9	1–18 (5%)	46–112 (29%)	4

Standings are determined by: 1. number of wins; 2. number of matches; 3. in two-team ties, head-to-head records; 4. in three-team ties, (a) percentage of sets won (head-to-head records if two teams remain tied), then (b) percentage of games won (head-to-head records if two teams remain tied), then (c) Davis Cup rankings.

==== Second-placed nation standings ====
The best second placed nation will be determined the following way (in the order set out below):

- The nation with the greatest number of points
- The nation with the highest percentage of matches won to total matches played.
- The nation with the highest percentage of sets won to total sets played.
- The nation with the highest percentage of games won to total games played.

For the two nations competing in the groups of four (Groups B & C), the results of the ties against the team that finishes in fourth place in those groups will not be included in the above calculations.

Pool	Nation	RR W–L	Set W–L	Game W–L	Standings
A	Guatemala	4–2	9–5 (64%)	73–64 (53%)	1
C	Puerto Rico	3–3	7–7 (50%)	64–59 (52%)	2
B	Bermuda	3–3	6–7 (46%)	58–63 (48%)	3

=== Playoffs ===
Placing	Team 1	Score	Team 2
Promotional	Costa Rica	0–2	Guatemala
Promotional	Bahamas	0–2	Jamaica
5th–6th	Bermuda	0–2	Puerto Rico
7th–8th	Cuba	2–0	Honduras
9th–10th	Panama	2–0	Trinidad and Tobago
11th	—		U.S. Virgin Islands

- Guatemala and Jamaica qualify for the 2022 Davis Cup World Group II Play-offs

== Round Robin ==
=== Pool A ===
==== Cuba vs. Bahamas ====
Cuba
1
Centro de Alto Rendimiento Fred Maduro, Panama City, Panama
30 June 2021
Clay

Bahamas
2

			1	2	3
1	(Cuba) (The Bahamas)	Lázaro Navarro; Kevin Major	6; 4	2; 6	2; 6
2	(Cuba) (The Bahamas)	Maikiel Ponte Suárez; Justin Roberts	4; 6	4; 6
3	(Cuba) (The Bahamas)	Joan Pérez Bernal / Osmel Rivera Granja; Baker Newman / Marvin Rolle	4; 6	7^{10} 6^{8}	6; 2

==== Guatemala vs. Cuba ====
Guatemala
3
Centro de Alto Rendimiento Fred Maduro, Panama City, Panama
1 July 2021
Clay

Cuba
0

			1	2	3
1	(Guatemala) (Cuba)	Christopher Díaz Figueroa; Lázaro Navarro	5; 7	6; 3	7^{7} 6^{3}
2	(Guatemala) (Cuba)	Wilfredo González; Osmel Rivera Granja	6; 4	7^{7} 6^{3}
3	(Guatemala) (Cuba)	Sebastián Domínguez / Wilfredo González; Lázaro Navarro / Joan Pérez Bernal	6; 2	7; 5

==== Guatemala vs. Bahamas ====
Guatemala
1
Centro de Alto Rendimiento Fred Maduro, Panama City, Panama
2 July 2021
Clay

Bahamas
2

			1	2	3
1	(Guatemala) (The Bahamas)	Christopher Díaz Figueroa; Kevin Major	6; 3	2; 6	4; 6
2	(Guatemala) (The Bahamas)	Wilfredo González; Justin Roberts	2; 6	3; 6
3	(Guatemala) (The Bahamas)	Christopher Díaz Figueroa / Wilfredo González; Baker Newman / Marvin Rolle	6; 4	6; 0

=== Pool B ===
==== Costa Rica vs. Trinidad and Tobago ====
Costa Rica
3
Centro de Alto Rendimiento Fred Maduro, Panama City, Panama
30 June 2021
Clay

Trinidad and Tobago
0

			1	2	3
1	(Costa Rica) (Trinidad and Tobago)	Sebastián Quirós; Kamran Curtis McIntosh-Ross	6; 2	5; 7	6; 2
2	(Costa Rica) (Trinidad and Tobago)	Jesse Flores; Nkrumah Patrick	6; 1	6; 1
3	(Costa Rica) (Trinidad and Tobago)	Jesse Flores / Pablo Núñez; Nkrumah Patrick / David Rodriguez	6; 1	6; 3

==== Honduras vs. Bermuda ====
Honduras
1
Centro de Alto Rendimiento Fred Maduro, Panama City, Panama
30 June 2021
Clay

Bermuda
2

			1	2	3
1	(Honduras) (Bermuda)	Keny Turcios; Richard Mallory	6^{4} 7^{7}	4; 6
2	(Honduras) (Bermuda)	Alejandro Obando; Tariq Simons	6; 1	6; 3
3	(Honduras) (Bermuda)	Ricardo Lau Cooper / Alejandro Obando; James Finnigan / Gavin Manders	1; 6	2; 6

==== Costa Rica vs. Honduras ====
Costa Rica
3
Centro de Alto Rendimiento Fred Maduro, Panama City, Panama
1 July 2021
Clay

Honduras
0

			1	2	3
1	(Costa Rica) (Honduras)	Pablo Núñez; Ricardo Lau Cooper	6; 3	6; 0
2	(Costa Rica) (Honduras)	Jesse Flores; Alejandro Obando	6; 4	4; 6	6; 0
3	(Costa Rica) (Honduras)	Rodrigo Crespo Piedra / Pablo Núñez; Ricardo Lau Cooper / Alejandro Obando	6; 3	6; 0

==== Bermuda vs. Trinidad and Tobago ====
Bermuda
3
Centro de Alto Rendimiento Fred Maduro, Panama City, Panama
1 July 2021
Clay

Trinidad and Tobago
0

			1	2	3
1	(Bermuda) (Trinidad and Tobago)	Richard Mallory; Ebolum Pastor Nwokolo	6; 0	7; 5
2	(Bermuda) (Trinidad and Tobago)	Tariq Simons; Nkrumah Patrick	6; 0	6; 0
3	(Bermuda) (Trinidad and Tobago)	James Finnigan / Gavin Manders; Kamran Curtis McIntosh-Ross / Nkrumah Patrick	7^{7} 6^{1}	7^{7} 6^{4}

==== Costa Rica vs. Bermuda ====
Costa Rica
2
Centro de Alto Rendimiento Fred Maduro, Panama City, Panama
2 July 2021
Clay

Bermuda
1

			1	2	3
1	(Costa Rica) (Bermuda)	Sebastián Quirós; Richard Mallory	5; 7	7^{7} 6^{1}	2; 6
2	(Costa Rica) (Bermuda)	Jesse Flores; Tariq Simons	6; 2	6; 1
3	(Costa Rica) (Bermuda)	Jesse Flores / Pablo Núñez; James Finnigan / Gavin Manders	6; 4	6; 3

==== Honduras vs. Trinidad and Tobago ====
Honduras
2
Centro de Alto Rendimiento Fred Maduro, Panama City, Panama
2 July 2021
Clay

Trinidad and Tobago
1

			1	2	3
1	(Honduras) (Trinidad and Tobago)	Ricardo Lau Cooper; Kamran Curtis McIntosh-Ross	3; 6	2; 6
2	(Honduras) (Trinidad and Tobago)	Alejandro Obando; Ebolum Pastor Nwokolo	6; 1	6; 1
3	(Honduras) (Trinidad and Tobago)	Alejandro Obando / Keny Turcios; Kamran Curtis McIntosh-Ross / Nkrumah Patrick	6; 1	6; 2

=== Pool C ===
==== Jamaica vs. U.S. Virgin Islands ====
Jamaica
3
Centro de Alto Rendimiento Fred Maduro, Panama City, Panama
30 June 2021
Clay

U.S. Virgin Islands
0

			1	2	3
1	(Jamaica) (United States Virgin Islands)	Rowland Phillips; Russell Armstrong	6; 1	6; 0
2	(Jamaica) (United States Virgin Islands)	Blaise Bicknell; Tomas del Olmo	6; 2	6; 3
3	(Jamaica) (United States Virgin Islands)	Jacob Bicknell / Rowland Phillips; Luca del Olmo / Tomas del Olmo	6; 2	7^{7} 6^{4}

==== Puerto Rico vs. Panama ====
Puerto Rico
2
Centro de Alto Rendimiento Fred Maduro, Panama City, Panama
30 June 2021
Clay

Panama
1

			1	2	3
1	(Puerto Rico) (Panama)	Sebastián Arcila; Marcelo Rodríguez	7^{7} 6^{3}	4; 0		retired
2	(Puerto Rico) (Panama)	Ignacio García; Jorge Daniel Chévez	6; 3	3; 6	2; 1	retired
3	(Puerto Rico) (Panama)	Alex Llompart / Quinton Vega; José Gilbert Gómez / Luis Gómez	6; 3	5; 7	5; 7

==== Jamaica vs. Panama ====
Jamaica
3
Centro de Alto Rendimiento Fred Maduro, Panama City, Panama
1 July 2021
Clay

Panama
0

			1	2	3
1	(Jamaica) (Panama)	Rowland Phillips; Marcelo Rodríguez	6; 2	6; 3
2	(Jamaica) (Panama)	Blaise Bicknell; José Gilbert Gómez	6; 3	6; 4
3	(Jamaica) (Panama)	Blaise Bicknell / Rowland Phillips; José Gilbert Gómez / Luis Gómez	6; 3	6; 2

==== Puerto Rico vs. U.S. Virgin Islands ====
Puerto Rico
3
Centro de Alto Rendimiento Fred Maduro, Panama City, Panama
1 July 2021
Clay

U.S. Virgin Islands
0

			1	2	3
1	(Puerto Rico) (United States Virgin Islands)	Sebastián Arcila; Russell Armstrong	6; 1	6; 1
2	(Puerto Rico) (United States Virgin Islands)	Ignacio García; Tomas del Olmo	6; 4	6; 2
3	(Puerto Rico) (United States Virgin Islands)	Sebastián Arcila / Ignacio García; Russell Armstrong / Luca del Olmo	6; 2	6; 2

==== Jamaica vs. Puerto Rico ====
Jamaica
2
Centro de Alto Rendimiento Fred Maduro, Panama City, Panama
2 July 2021
Clay

Puerto Rico
1

			1	2	3
1	(Jamaica) (Puerto Rico)	Rowland Phillips; Sebastián Arcila	6; 3	6; 0
2	(Jamaica) (Puerto Rico)	Blaise Bicknell; Quinton Vega	6; 4	6; 1
3	(Jamaica) (Puerto Rico)	Blaise Bicknell / Dimitri Bird; Sebastián Arcila / Ignacio García	1; 6	2; 6

==== Panama vs. U.S. Virgin Islands ====
Panama
3
Centro de Alto Rendimiento Fred Maduro, Panama City, Panama
2 July 2021
Clay

U.S. Virgin Islands
0

			1	2	3
1	(Panama) (United States Virgin Islands)	Luis Gómez; Russell Armstrong	6; 1	6; 3
2	(Panama) (United States Virgin Islands)	Marcelo Rodríguez; Tomas del Olmo	6; 3	3; 6	6; 4
3	(Panama) (United States Virgin Islands)	Jorge Daniel Chévez / José Gilbert Gómez; Luca del Olmo / Kevin Motta	6; 1	6; 2

== Play-offs ==
=== Promotional play-offs ===
==== Costa Rica vs. Guatemala ====
Costa Rica
0
Centro de Alto Rendimiento Fred Maduro, Panama City, Panama
3 July 2021
Clay

Guatemala
2

			1	2	3
1	(Costa Rica) (Guatemala)	Pablo Núñez; Christopher Díaz Figueroa	3; 6	3; 6
2	(Costa Rica) (Guatemala)	Jesse Flores; Wilfredo González	3; 6	2; 6
3	(Costa Rica) (Guatemala)	Jesse Flores / Pablo Núñez; Christopher Díaz Figueroa / Wilfredo González				not played

==== Bahamas vs. Jamaica ====
Bahamas
0
Centro de Alto Rendimiento Fred Maduro, Panama City, Panama
3 July 2021
Clay

Jamaica
2

			1	2	3
1	(The Bahamas) (Jamaica)	Kevin Major; Rowland Phillips	3; 6	2; 6
2	(The Bahamas) (Jamaica)	Justin Roberts; Blaise Bicknell	6; 2	3; 6	4; 6
3	(The Bahamas) (Jamaica)	Justin Roberts / Marvin Rolle; Blaise Bicknell / Rowland Phillips				not played

=== 5th to 6th play-offs ===
==== Bermuda vs. Puerto Rico ====
Bermuda
0
Centro de Alto Rendimiento Fred Maduro, Panama City, Panama
3 July 2021
Clay

Puerto Rico
2

			1	2	3
1	(Bermuda) (Puerto Rico)	Richard Mallory; Ignacio García	4; 6	4; 6
2	(Bermuda) (Puerto Rico)	Tariq Simons; Quinton Vega	4; 6	0; 6
3	(Bermuda) (Puerto Rico)	James Finnigan / Gavin Manders; Sebastián Arcila / Quinton Vega				not played

=== 7th to 8th play-offs ===
==== Cuba vs. Honduras ====
Cuba
2
Centro de Alto Rendimiento Fred Maduro, Panama City, Panama
3 July 2021
Clay

Honduras
0

			1	2	3
1	(Cuba) (Honduras)	Lázaro Navarro; Diego José Sosa Rodríguez	6; 0	6; 0
2	(Cuba) (Honduras)	Maikiel Ponte Suárez; Alejandro Obando	4; 6	6; 3	6; 2
3	(Cuba) (Honduras)	Joan Pérez Bernal / Osmel Rivera Granja; Ricardo Lau Cooper / Alejandro Obando				not played

=== 9th to 10th play-offs ===
==== Panama vs. Trinidad and Tobago ====
Panama
2
Centro de Alto Rendimiento Fred Maduro, Panama City, Panama
3 July 2021
Clay

Trinidad and Tobago
0

			1	2	3
1	(Panama) (Trinidad and Tobago)	Luis Gómez; David Rodriguez	6; 3	6; 0
2	(Panama) (Trinidad and Tobago)	Marcelo Rodríguez; Kamran Curtis McIntosh-Ross	6; 0	6; 4
3	(Panama) (Trinidad and Tobago)	Jorge Daniel Chévez / Marcelo Rodríguez; Ebolum Pastor Nwokolo / Nkrumah Patrick				not played
