= 2022 Davis Cup Americas Zone Group IV =

Davis Cup competition in 2022

The Americas Zone was the unique zone within Group 4 of the regional Davis Cup competition in 2022. The zone's competition was held in round robin format in Tacarigua, Trinidad and Tobago, from 1 to 6 August 2022.

== Participating nations ==
- Antigua and Barbuda
- Aruba
- Bermuda
- Cuba
- Haiti
- Honduras
- Nicaragua
- Trinidad and Tobago
- U.S. Virgin Islands

== Draw ==
Date: 1–6 August 2022

Location: National Racquet Centre, Tacarigua, Trinidad and Tobago (hard)

Format: Round-robin basis. One pool of five teams and one pool of four teams. The top two finishers of each pool will play-off against each other to determine the two nations promoted to Americas Group III in 2023.

=== Seeding ===
Pot	Nation	Rank^{1}	Seed
1	Bermuda	88	1
1	Cuba	92	2
2	Honduras	94	3
2	U.S. Virgin Islands	114	4
3	Trinidad and Tobago	115	5
3	Antigua and Barbuda	134	6
4	Aruba	NR	–
4	Haiti	NR	–
4	Nicaragua	NR	–

- ^{1}Davis Cup Rankings as of 7 March 2022

=== Round Robin ===
==== Pool A ====
		BER	HON	ATG	HAI	RR; W–L	Set; W–L	Game; W–L	Standings
1	Bermuda		2–1	2–1	3–0	3–0	14–4 (78%)	97–61 (61%)	1
3	Honduras	1–2		2–1	3–0	2–1	12–6 (67%)	91–63 (59%)	2
6	Antigua and Barbuda	1–2	1–2		2–1	1–2	8–10 (44%)	67–77 (47%)	3
–	Haiti	0–3	0–3	1–2		0–3	2–16 (11%)	48–102 (32%)	4

==== Pool B ====
		ARU	CUB	NCA	TTO	ISV	RR; W–L	Set; W–L	Game; W–L	Standings
–	Aruba		2–1	2–1	3–0	3–0	4–0	20–9 (69%)	151–113 (57%)	1
2	Cuba	1–2		2–1	3–0	2–1	3–1	18–12 (60%)	157–134 (54%)	2
–	Nicaragua	1–2	1–2		2–1	3–0	2–2	17–13 (57%)	147–120 (55%)	3
5	Trinidad and Tobago	0–3	0–3	1–2		3–0	1–3	13–16 (45%)	131–149 (47%)	4
4	U.S. Virgin Islands	0–3	1–2	0–3	0–3		0–4	5–23 (18%)	82–152 (35%)	5

Standings are determined by: 1. number of wins; 2. number of matches; 3. in two-team ties, head-to-head records; 4. in three-team ties, (a) percentage of sets won (head-to-head records if two teams remain tied), then (b) percentage of games won (head-to-head records if two teams remain tied), then (c) Davis Cup rankings.

=== Playoffs ===
Placing	A Team	Score	B Team
Promotional	Bermuda	2–0	Cuba
Promotional	Honduras	2–1	Aruba
5th–6th	Antigua and Barbuda	0–2	Nicaragua
7th–8th	Haiti	1–2	Trinidad and Tobago
9th	—N/a		U.S. Virgin Islands

- Bermuda and Honduras are promoted to America Group III in 2023.

== Round Robin ==
=== Pool A ===
==== Bermuda vs. Haiti ====
Bermuda
3
National Racquet Centre, Tacarigua, Trinidad and Tobago
1 August 2022
Hard

Haiti
0

			1	2	3
1	(Bermuda) (Haiti)	Richard Mallory; James Adler Germinal	7; 5	6; 2
2	(Bermuda) (Haiti)	Tariq Simons; Christopher Bogelin	6; 3	6; 0
3	(Bermuda) (Haiti)	James Finnigan / Gavin Manders; Junior Bazanne / James Adler Germinal	6; 1	7^{7} 6^{1}

==== Honduras vs. Antigua and Barbuda ====
Honduras
2
National Racquet Centre, Tacarigua, Trinidad and Tobago
1 August 2022
Hard

Antigua and Barbuda
1

			1	2	3
1	(Honduras) (Antigua and Barbuda)	Keny Turcios; Cordell Williams	6; 0	6; 0
2	(Honduras) (Antigua and Barbuda)	Alejandro Obando; Jody Maginley	2; 6	4; 6
3	(Honduras) (Antigua and Barbuda)	Alejandro Obando / Keny Turcios; Kyle Joseph / Jody Maginley	6; 4	6; 4

==== Bermuda vs. Antigua and Barbuda ====
Bermuda
2
National Racquet Centre, Tacarigua, Trinidad and Tobago
2 August 2022
Hard

Antigua and Barbuda
1

			1	2	3
1	(Bermuda) (Antigua and Barbuda)	Richard Mallory; Cordell Williams	6; 1	6; 1
2	(Bermuda) (Antigua and Barbuda)	Tariq Simons; Jody Maginley	0; 6	3; 6
3	(Bermuda) (Antigua and Barbuda)	James Finnigan / Gavin Manders; Kyle Joseph / Jody Maginley	6; 3	6; 3

==== Honduras vs. Haiti ====
Honduras
3
National Racquet Centre, Tacarigua, Trinidad and Tobago
2 August 2022
Hard

Haiti
0

			1	2	3
1	(Honduras) (Haiti)	Keny Turcios; James Adler Germinal	6; 2	7; 5
2	(Honduras) (Haiti)	Alejandro Obando; Christopher Bogelin	6; 3	6; 0
3	(Honduras) (Haiti)	Alejandro Obando / Keny Turcios; Junior Bazanne / Walton Louis	6; 1	6; 0

==== Bermuda vs. Honduras ====
Bermuda
2
National Racquet Centre, Tacarigua, Trinidad and Tobago
4 August 2022
Hard

Honduras
1

			1	2	3
1	(Bermuda) (Honduras)	Richard Mallory; Keny Turcios	7; 5	6; 0
2	(Bermuda) (Honduras)	James Finnigan; Alejandro Obando	4; 6	3; 6
3	(Bermuda) (Honduras)	Richard Mallory / Gavin Manders; Alejandro Obando / Keny Turcios	6; 4	6; 3

==== Antigua and Barbuda vs. Haiti ====
Antigua and Barbuda
2
National Racquet Centre, Tacarigua, Trinidad and Tobago
4 August 2022
Hard

Haiti
1

			1	2	3
1	(Antigua and Barbuda) (Haiti)	Ron Murraine; James Adler Germinal	2; 6	1; 6
2	(Antigua and Barbuda) (Haiti)	Jody Maginley; Christopher Bogelin	6; 1	6; 1
3	(Antigua and Barbuda) (Haiti)	Jody Maginley / Cordell Williams; Christopher Bogelin / Walton Louis	6; 4	6; 2

=== Pool B ===
==== Cuba vs. U.S. Virgin Islands ====
Cuba
2
National Racquet Centre, Tacarigua, Trinidad and Tobago
1 August 2022
Hard

U.S. Virgin Islands
1

			1	2	3
1	(Cuba) (United States Virgin Islands)	Osmel Rivera Granja; Nicholas Bass	6; 1	6; 3
2	(Cuba) (United States Virgin Islands)	Osviel Turino; Tomas del Olmo	6; 3	0; 6	4; 6
3	(Cuba) (United States Virgin Islands)	Yoan Pérez / Osmel Rivera Granja; Luca del Olmo / Tomas del Olmo	4; 6	6; 3	7^{7} 6^{5}

==== Trinidad and Tobago vs. Aruba ====
Trinidad and Tobago
0
National Racquet Centre, Tacarigua, Trinidad and Tobago
1 August 2022
Hard

Aruba
3

			1	2	3
1	(Trinidad and Tobago) (Aruba)	Joseph Cadogan; Frederick Sydow	6; 4	3; 6	4; 6
2	(Trinidad and Tobago) (Aruba)	Ebolum Pastor Nwokolo; Patrick Sydow	6; 4	2; 6	2; 6
3	(Trinidad and Tobago) (Aruba)	Akiel Duke / Nabeel Majeed Mohammed; Frederick Sydow / Patrick Sydow	4; 6	5; 7

==== Cuba vs. Trinidad and Tobago ====
Cuba
3
National Racquet Centre, Tacarigua, Trinidad and Tobago
2 August 2022
Hard

Trinidad and Tobago
0

			1	2	3
1	(Cuba) (Trinidad and Tobago)	Osmel Rivera Granja; Joseph Cadogan	6^{3} 7^{7}	7; 5		retired
2	(Cuba) (Trinidad and Tobago)	Osviel Turino; Ebolum Pastor Nwokolo	6; 1	6; 3
3	(Cuba) (Trinidad and Tobago)	Yoan Pérez / Dayron Zuñiga; Akiel Duke / Nabeel Majeed Mohammed	7^{7} 6^{3}	5; 7	6; 3

==== U.S. Virgin Islands vs. Nicaragua ====
U.S. Virgin Islands
0
National Racquet Centre, Tacarigua, Trinidad and Tobago
2 August 2022
Hard

Nicaragua
3

			1	2	3
1	(United States Virgin Islands) (Nicaragua)	Luca del Olmo; Francisco Bendaña	0; 6	1; 6
2	(United States Virgin Islands) (Nicaragua)	Tomas del Olmo; Joaquín Guilleme	6; 3	0; 6	3; 6
3	(United States Virgin Islands) (Nicaragua)	Nicholas Bass / Luca del Olmo; Alfredo Gallegos / Luis Márquez	0; 6	3; 6

==== U.S. Virgin Islands vs. Aruba ====
U.S. Virgin Islands
0
National Racquet Centre, Tacarigua, Trinidad and Tobago
3 August 2022
Hard

Aruba
3

			1	2	3
1	(United States Virgin Islands) (Aruba)	Finlay Miller; Frederick Sydow	1; 6	1; 6
2	(United States Virgin Islands) (Aruba)	Tomas del Olmo; Patrick Sydow	6; 2	3; 6	3; 6
3	(United States Virgin Islands) (Aruba)	Luca del Olmo / Tomas del Olmo; Frederick Sydow / Patrick Sydow	2; 6	1; 6

==== Cuba vs. Nicaragua ====
Cuba
2
National Racquet Centre, Tacarigua, Trinidad and Tobago
3 August 2022
Hard

Nicaragua
1

			1	2	3
1	(Cuba) (Nicaragua)	Osmel Rivera Granja; Francisco Bendaña	4; 6	6; 2	6; 4
2	(Cuba) (Nicaragua)	Osviel Turino; Joaquín Guilleme	3; 6	6; 3	2; 6
3	(Cuba) (Nicaragua)	Yoan Pérez / Osmel Rivera Granja; Francisco Bendaña / Luis Márquez	7^{7} 6^{4}	6; 3

==== Cuba vs. Aruba ====
Cuba
1
National Racquet Centre, Tacarigua, Trinidad and Tobago
4 August 2022
Hard

Aruba
2

			1	2	3
1	(Cuba) (Aruba)	Osmel Rivera Granja; Frederick Sydow	6; 2	6; 4
2	(Cuba) (Aruba)	Osviel Turino; Patrick Sydow	5; 7	3; 6
3	(Cuba) (Aruba)	Yoan Pérez / Osmel Rivera Granja; Frederick Sydow / Patrick Sydow	5; 7	4; 6

==== Trinidad and Tobago vs. Nicaragua ====
Trinidad and Tobago
1
National Racquet Centre, Tacarigua, Trinidad and Tobago
4 August 2022
Hard

Nicaragua
2

			1	2	3
1	(Trinidad and Tobago) (Nicaragua)	Akiel Duke; Alfredo Gallegos	6; 3	1; 6	5; 7
2	(Trinidad and Tobago) (Nicaragua)	Nabeel Majeed Mohammed; Luis Márquez	2; 6	5; 7
3	(Trinidad and Tobago) (Nicaragua)	Joseph Cadogan / Luca Shamsi; Alfredo Gallegos / Luis Márquez	6; 4	6; 4

==== U.S. Virgin Islands vs. Trinidad and Tobago ====
U.S. Virgin Islands
0
National Racquet Centre, Tacarigua, Trinidad and Tobago
5 August 2022
Hard

Trinidad and Tobago
3

			1	2	3
1	(United States Virgin Islands) (Trinidad and Tobago)	Luca del Olmo; Luca Shamsi	1; 6	2; 6
2	(United States Virgin Islands) (Trinidad and Tobago)	Tomas del Olmo; Joseph Cadogan	4; 6	4; 6
3	(United States Virgin Islands) (Trinidad and Tobago)	Nicholas Bass / Tomas del Olmo; Akiel Duke / Nabeel Majeed Mohammed	3; 6	4; 6

==== Aruba vs. Nicaragua ====
Aruba
2
National Racquet Centre, Tacarigua, Trinidad and Tobago
5 August 2022
Hard

Nicaragua
1

			1	2	3
1	(Aruba) (Nicaragua)	Frederick Sydow; Luis Márquez	3; 6	6; 4	6; 3
2	(Aruba) (Nicaragua)	Patrick Sydow; Joaquín Guilleme	3; 6	2; 6
3	(Aruba) (Nicaragua)	Frederick Sydow / Patrick Sydow; Francisco Bendaña / Joaquín Guilleme	6; 2	4; 6	6; 2

== Play-offs ==
=== Promotional play-offs ===
==== Bermuda vs. Cuba ====
Bermuda
2
National Racquet Centre, Tacarigua, Trinidad and Tobago
6 August 2022
Hard

Cuba
0

			1	2	3
1	(Bermuda) (Cuba)	Richard Mallory; Osmel Rivera Granja	6; 1	6; 1
2	(Bermuda) (Cuba)	Tariq Simons; Osviel Turino	7^{8} 6^{6}	6; 0
3	(Bermuda) (Cuba)	James Finnigan / Gavin Manders; Yoan Pérez / Osmel Rivera Granja				not played

==== Aruba vs. Honduras ====
Aruba
1
National Racquet Centre, Tacarigua, Trinidad and Tobago
6 August 2022
Hard

Honduras
2

			1	2	3
1	(Aruba) (Honduras)	Frederick Sydow; Keny Turcios	0; 6	3; 6
2	(Aruba) (Honduras)	Patrick Sydow; Alejandro Obando	6; 3	6^{4} 7^{7}	7^{7} 6^{5}
3	(Aruba) (Honduras)	Frederick Sydow / Patrick Sydow; Alejandro Obando / Keny Turcios	2; 6	3; 6

=== 5th place play-offs ===
==== Antigua and Barbuda vs. Nicaragua ====
Antigua and Barbuda
0
National Racquet Centre, Tacarigua, Trinidad and Tobago
6 August 2022
Hard

Nicaragua
2

			1	2	3
1	(Antigua and Barbuda) (Nicaragua)	Ron Murraine; Francisco Bendaña	1; 6	0; 6
2	(Antigua and Barbuda) (Nicaragua)	Jody Maginley; Joaquín Guilleme	4; 6	3; 6
3	(Antigua and Barbuda) (Nicaragua)	Jody Maginley / Ron Murraine; Francisco Bendaña / Luis Márquez				not played

=== 7th place play-offs ===
==== Haiti vs. Trinidad and Tobago ====
Haiti
1
National Racquet Centre, Tacarigua, Trinidad and Tobago
6 August 2022
Hard

Trinidad and Tobago
2

			1	2	3
1	(Haiti) (Trinidad and Tobago)	Walton Louis; Luca Shamsi	3; 6	1; 6
2	(Haiti) (Trinidad and Tobago)	Christopher Bogelin; Ebolum Pastor Nwokolo	6; 3	6; 4
3	(Haiti) (Trinidad and Tobago)	Junior Bazanne / Christopher Bogelin; Akiel Duke / Nabeel Majeed Mohammed	2; 6	2; 6
