= 2022 Davis Cup Americas Zone Group III =

Davis Cup competition in 2022

The Americas Zone was the unique zone within Group 3 of the regional Davis Cup competition in 2022. The zone's competition was held in round robin format in Escazú, Costa Rica, from 22 to 25 June 2022.

== Participating nations ==
- Bahamas
- Costa Rica
- Guatemala
- Jamaica
- Panama
- Paraguay
- Puerto Rico
- Venezuela

== Draw ==
Date: 22–25 June 2022

Location: Costa Rica Country Club, Escazú, Costa Rica (hard)

Format: Round-robin basis. Two pools of four teams and nations will play each team once in their group. The two group winners will automatically earn promotion to the World Group II play-offs in 2022.

The two second-placed teams will fight for the third remaining promotion spot. The four teams finishing in third and last place will fight to avoid relegation to Americas Group IV.

=== Seeding ===
Pot	Nation	Rank^{1}	Seed
1	Venezuela	66	1
1	Paraguay	70	2
2	Jamaica	71	3
2	Guatemala	72	4
3	Costa Rica	78	5
3	Puerto Rico	79	6
4	Bahamas	81	7
4	Panama	84	8

- ^{1}Davis Cup Rankings as of 7 March 2022

=== Round Robin ===
==== Pool A ====
		VEN	PAN	GUA	PUR	RR; W–L	Set; W–L	Game; W–L	Standings
1	Venezuela		3–0	2–1	3–0	3–0	17–3 (85%)	115–62 (65%)	1
8	Panama	0–3		2–1	2–1	2–1	9–12 (43%)	89–101 (47%)	2
4	Guatemala	1–2	1–2		2–1	1–2	9–10 (47%)	79–103 (43%)	3
6	Puerto Rico	0–3	1–2	1–2		0–3	7–15 (32%)	89–106 (46%)	4

==== Pool B ====
		PAR	JAM	CRC	BAH	RR; W–L	Set; W–L	Game; W–L	Standings
2	Paraguay		2–1	3–0	2–1	3–0	16–7 (70%)	131–102 (56%)	1
3	Jamaica	1–2		2–1	2–1	2–1	11–9 (55%)	106–86 (55%)	2
5	Costa Rica	0–3	1–2		2–1	1–2	8–12 (40%)	76–103 (42%)	3
7	Bahamas	1–2	1–2	1–2		0–3	6–13 (32%)	76–98 (44%)	4

Standings are determined by: 1. number of wins; 2. number of matches; 3. in two-team ties, head-to-head records; 4. in three-team ties, (a) percentage of sets won (head-to-head records if two teams remain tied), then (b) percentage of games won (head-to-head records if two teams remain tied), then (c) Davis Cup rankings.

=== Playoffs ===
Placing	A Team	Score	B Team
1st–2nd	Venezuela	0–2	Paraguay
Promotion	Jamaica	3–0	Panama
Relegation	Guatemala	0–2	Bahamas
Relegation	Costa Rica	2–1	Puerto Rico

- Paraguay, Venezuela and Jamaica qualify for the 2023 Davis Cup World Group II Play-offs
- Guatemala and Puerto Rico are relegated to 2023 Davis Cup Americas Zone Group IV

== Round Robin ==
=== Pool A ===
==== Venezuela vs. Panama ====
Venezuela
3
Costa Rica Country Club, Escazú, Costa Rica
22 June 2022
Hard

Panama
0

			1	2	3
1	(Venezuela) (Panama)	Rafael Abdul Salam; Marcelo Rodríguez	6; 3	6; 3
2	(Venezuela) (Panama)	Ricardo Rodríguez-Pace; Luis Gómez	6; 1	6; 3
3	(Venezuela) (Panama)	Brandon Pérez / Ricardo Rodríguez-Pace; José Gilbert Gómez / Luis Gómez	7; 5	6; 4

==== Guatemala vs. Puerto Rico ====
Guatemala
2
Costa Rica Country Club, Escazú, Costa Rica
22 June 2022
Hard

Puerto Rico
1

			1	2	3
1	(Guatemala) (Puerto Rico)	Kris Alessandro Hernández Mariona; Ignacio García	1; 6	2; 6
2	(Guatemala) (Puerto Rico)	Sebastián Domínguez; Christian Garay	6; 3	6; 4
3	(Guatemala) (Puerto Rico)	Sebastián Domínguez / Kaeri Hernández Mariona; Christian Garay / Ignacio García	6; 2	3; 6	6; 4

==== Venezuela vs. Puerto Rico ====
Venezuela
3
Costa Rica Country Club, Escazú, Costa Rica
23 June 2022
Hard

Puerto Rico
0

			1	2	3
1	(Venezuela) (Puerto Rico)	Rafael Abdul Salam; Ignacio García	5; 7	6; 3		retired
2	(Venezuela) (Puerto Rico)	Ricardo Rodríguez-Pace; Christian Garay	6; 3	6; 1
3	(Venezuela) (Puerto Rico)	Brandon Pérez / Francisco Sinopoli; Christian Garay / Juan Enrique Marrero	6; 4	6; 4

==== Guatemala vs. Panama ====
Guatemala
1
Costa Rica Country Club, Escazú, Costa Rica
23 June 2022
Hard

Panama
2

			1	2	3
1	(Guatemala) (Panama)	Sebastián Domínguez; Jorge Daniel Chevez	6; 4	6; 1
2	(Guatemala) (Panama)	Kaeri Hernández Mariona; Marcelo Rodríguez	2; 6	1; 6
3	(Guatemala) (Panama)	Sebastián Domínguez / Kaeri Hernández Mariona; Luis Gómez / Marcelo Rodríguez	7^{8} 6^{6}	3; 6	3; 6

==== Venezuela vs. Guatemala ====
Venezuela
2
Costa Rica Country Club, Escazú, Costa Rica
24 June 2022
Hard

Guatemala
1

			1	2	3
1	(Venezuela) (Guatemala)	Rafael Abdul Salam; Rafael Botran Neutze	6; 2	6; 3
2	(Venezuela) (Guatemala)	Ricardo Rodríguez-Pace; Kris Alessandro Hernández Mariona	6; 2	6; 0
3	(Venezuela) (Guatemala)	Brandon Pérez / Francisco Sinopoli; Rafael Botran Neutze / Sebastián Domínguez	6; 2	4; 6	3; 6

==== Puerto Rico vs. Panama ====
Puerto Rico
1
Costa Rica Country Club, Escazú, Costa Rica
24 June 2022
Hard

Panama
2

			1	2	3
1	(Puerto Rico) (Panama)	Ignacio García; Jorge Daniel Chevez	2; 6	6; 2	6; 0
2	(Puerto Rico) (Panama)	Christian Garay; Marcelo Rodríguez	4; 6	5; 7
3	(Puerto Rico) (Panama)	Ignacio García / Juan Enrique Marrero; Luis Gómez / Marcelo Rodríguez	4; 6	6; 2	3; 6

=== Pool B ===
==== Paraguay vs. Bahamas ====
Paraguay
2
Costa Rica Country Club, Escazú, Costa Rica
22 June 2022
Hard

Bahamas
1

			1	2	3
1	(Paraguay) (The Bahamas)	Juan Borba; Spencer Newman	6; 3	6; 4
2	(Paraguay) (The Bahamas)	Daniel Vallejo; Kevin Major	7; 5			retired
3	(Paraguay) (The Bahamas)	Daniel Vallejo / Martín Antonio Vergara del Puerto; Baker Newman / Marvin Rolle	6; 2	5; 7	6^{5} 7^{7}

==== Jamaica vs. Costa Rica ====
Jamaica
2
Costa Rica Country Club, Escazú, Costa Rica
22 June 2022
Hard

Costa Rica
1

			1	2	3
1	(Jamaica) (Costa Rica)	Rowland Phillips; Sebastián Quirós	6; 0	6; 2
2	(Jamaica) (Costa Rica)	Blaise Bicknell; Jesse Flores	6; 3	6; 1
3	(Jamaica) (Costa Rica)	John Chin / Rowland Phillips; Jesse Flores / Pablo Núñez	3; 6	6^{7} 7^{9}

==== Paraguay vs. Costa Rica ====
Paraguay
3
Costa Rica Country Club, Escazú, Costa Rica
23 June 2022
Hard

Costa Rica
0

			1	2	3
1	(Paraguay) (Costa Rica)	Juan Borba; Sebastián Quirós	6; 3	5; 7	4; 2	retired
2	(Paraguay) (Costa Rica)	Daniel Vallejo; Jesse Flores	6; 2	6; 2
3	(Paraguay) (Costa Rica)	Hernando José Escurra Isnardi / Martín Antonio Vergara del Puerto; Julián Lozano / Pablo Núñez	6^{4} 7^{7}	6; 2	7^{7} 6^{4}

==== Jamaica vs. Bahamas ====
Jamaica
2
Costa Rica Country Club, Escazú, Costa Rica
23 June 2022
Hard

Bahamas
1

			1	2	3
1	(Jamaica) (The Bahamas)	Rowland Phillips; Baker Newman	7^{7} 6^{1}	7; 5
2	(Jamaica) (The Bahamas)	Blaise Bicknell; Spencer Newman	6; 2	6; 1
3	(Jamaica) (The Bahamas)	Jacob Bicknell / John Chin; Spencer Newman / Marvin Rolle	2; 6	2; 6

==== Paraguay vs. Jamaica ====
Paraguay
2
Costa Rica Country Club, Escazú, Costa Rica
24 June 2022
Hard

Jamaica
1

			1	2	3
1	(Paraguay) (Jamaica)	Martín Antonio Vergara del Puerto; Rowland Phillips	7^{9} 6^{7}	0; 6	2; 6
2	(Paraguay) (Jamaica)	Daniel Vallejo; Blaise Bicknell	7^{8} 6^{6}	6^{7} 7^{9}	6; 3
3	(Paraguay) (Jamaica)	Daniel Vallejo / Martín Antonio Vergara del Puerto; John Chin / Rowland Phillips	6; 3	7^{7} 6^{5}

==== Costa Rica vs. Bahamas ====
Costa Rica
2
Costa Rica Country Club, Escazú, Costa Rica
24 June 2022
Hard

Bahamas
1

			1	2	3
1	(Costa Rica) (The Bahamas)	Julián Lozano; Baker Newman	2; 6	0; 6
2	(Costa Rica) (The Bahamas)	Jesse Flores; Spencer Newman	6; 3	6; 2
3	(Costa Rica) (The Bahamas)	Jesse Flores / Pablo Núñez; Baker Newman / Marvin Rolle	6; 3	6; 2

== Play-offs ==
=== Promotional play-offs ===
==== Venezuela vs. Paraguay ====
Venezuela
0
Costa Rica Country Club, Escazú, Costa Rica
25 June 2022
Hard

Paraguay
2

			1	2	3
1	(Venezuela) (Paraguay)	Rafael Abdul Salam; Hernando José Escurra Isnardi	2; 6	3; 6
2	(Venezuela) (Paraguay)	Brandon Pérez; Daniel Vallejo	4; 6	0; 6
3	(Venezuela) (Paraguay)	Brandon Pérez / Ricardo Rodríguez-Pace; Hernando José Escurra Isnardi / Martín Antonio Vergara del Puerto				not played

==== Jamaica vs. Panama ====
Jamaica
3
Costa Rica Country Club, Escazú, Costa Rica
25 June 2022
Hard

Panama
0

			1	2	3
1	(Jamaica) (Panama)	Rowland Phillips; Marcelo Rodríguez	6; 2	0; 6	6; 3
2	(Jamaica) (Panama)	Blaise Bicknell; José Gilbert Gómez	6; 0	6; 1
3	(Jamaica) (Panama)	Daniel Azar / Blaise Bicknell; Marcelo Rodríguez / Chad Valdés	6; 2	6; 4

=== Relegation play-offs ===
==== Guatemala vs. Bahamas ====
Guatemala
0
Costa Rica Country Club, Escazú, Costa Rica
25 June 2022
Hard

Bahamas
2

			1	2	3
1	(Guatemala) (The Bahamas)	Sebastián Domínguez; Baker Newman	2; 6	5; 7
2	(Guatemala) (The Bahamas)	Kaeri Hernández Mariona; Kevin Major	1; 6	2; 6
3	(Guatemala) (The Bahamas)	Rafael Botran Neutze / Kris Alessandro Hernández Mariona; Baker Newman / Marvin Rolle				not played

==== Costa Rica vs. Puerto Rico ====
Costa Rica
2
Costa Rica Country Club, Escazú, Costa Rica
25 June 2022
Hard

Puerto Rico
1

			1	2	3
1	(Costa Rica) (Puerto Rico)	Sebastián Quirós; Ignacio García	2; 6	1; 6
2	(Costa Rica) (Puerto Rico)	Jesse Flores; Christian Garay	7^{7} 6^{3}	6; 2
3	(Costa Rica) (Puerto Rico)	Jesse Flores / Pablo Núñez; Ignacio García / Juan Enrique Marrero	5; 7	7^{7} 6^{5}	6; 3

== Final placements ==
Placing	Teams	
Promoted/First	Paraguay	
Promoted/Second	Venezuela	
Promoted/Third	Jamaica	
Fourth	Panama	
Fifth	Bahamas	Costa Rica
Relegated/Seventh	Guatemala	Puerto Rico

- Paraguay, Venezuela and Jamaica qualify for the 2023 Davis Cup World Group II Play-offs
- Guatemala and Puerto Rico are relegated to 2023 Davis Cup Americas Zone Group IV
