= 2011 Atlanta Tennis Championships – Singles Qualifying =

This article displays the qualifying draw of the 2011 Atlanta Tennis Championships.

== Players ==
=== Seeds ===
1. (Australia) Marinko Matosevic (qualified)
2. (Australia) Matthew Ebden (qualifying competition)
3. (Japan) Yuichi Sugita (qualified)
4. (United States) Tim Smyczek (qualifying competition)
5. (Australia) Greg Jones (second round)
6. (United States) Rajeev Ram (qualified)
7. (United States) Denis Kudla (qualifying competition)
8. (Australia) Nick Lindahl (first round, retired due to wrist injury)

=== Qualifiers ===
1. (Australia) Marinko Matosevic
2. (United States) Rajeev Ram
3. (Japan) Yuichi Sugita
4. (United States) Phillip Simmonds

== Qualifying draw ==
=== First qualifier ===
First Round
(United States) Jack Anton	2	2
(United States) Mac Styslinger	6	6
(United States) Austin Smith	6	7
(United States) Nathaniel Schnugg	3	5
(United Kingdom) Colin Fleming	5	2^{r}
7	(United States) Denis Kudla	7	3

Second Round
1	(Australia) Marinko Matosevic	7	6
(United States) Mac Styslinger	5	0
(United States) Austin Smith	4	4
7	(United States) Denis Kudla	6	6

Qualifying Competition
1	(Australia) Marinko Matosevic	6	1	7^{7}
7	(United States) Denis Kudla	1	6	6^{3}

=== Second qualifier ===
First Round				Second Round				Qualifying Competition
				2	(Australia) Matthew Ebden	6	6
(Latvia) Kārlis Lejnieks	3	5			(United States) Daniel Kosakowski	1	2
(United States) Daniel Kosakowski	6	7						2	(Australia) Matthew Ebden	6^{4}	3
(Chile) Nicolás Massú	3	7^{7}	6					6	(United States) Rajeev Ram	7^{7}	6
(United States) Kevin King	6	6^{5}	4		(Chile) Nicolás Massú	3	6^{5}
				6	(United States) Rajeev Ram	6	7^{7}

=== Third qualifier ===
First Round
(Barbados) Haydn Lewis	6	6
(United States) Drake Bernstein	1	4
(Haiti) Olivier Sajous	6	6
(Brazil) Alfredo Krywacz	1	2
WC	(United States) Wil Spencer	6^{4}	6
8	(Australia) Nick Lindahl	7^{7}	3	r

Second Round
3	(Japan) Yuichi Sugita	6	6
(Barbados) Haydn Lewis	1	4
(Haiti) Olivier Sajous	6	7
WC	(United States) Wil Spencer	4	5

Qualifying Competition
3	(Japan) Yuichi Sugita	6	6
(Haiti) Olivier Sajous	2	3

=== Fourth qualifier ===
First Round				Second Round				Qualifying Competition
				4	(United States) Tim Smyczek	6	6
	(United States) Gabriel Townes	7	6		(United States) Gabriel Townes	4	2
	(United States) Eric Graves	5	1					4	(United States) Tim Smyczek	7^{7}	3	2
WC	(Spain) Guillermo Gómez-Diaz	4	4						(United States) Phillip Simmonds	6^{5}	6	6
	(United States) Phillip Simmonds	6	6		(United States) Phillip Simmonds	6	7^{7}
				5	(Australia) Greg Jones	3	6^{2}
