= Ibian Hodgson =

Aruban tennis player

- Country (sports): Aruba
- Born: 30 June 1993 (age 33) Savaneta, Aruba
- College: Wichita State University (2013–2014)
- Prize money: $118

Singles
- Career record: 0–0 (at ATP Tour level, Grand Slam level, and in Davis Cup)
- Career titles: 0

Doubles
- Career record: 0–0 (at ATP Tour level, Grand Slam level, and in Davis Cup)
- Career titles: 0

Team competitions
- Davis Cup: 0-8

Ibian Hodgson (born 30 June 1993) is an Aruban tennis player. Hodgson studied at Wichita State University from 2013 to 2014. Hodgson has represented Aruba at the Davis Cup, where he has a win-loss record of 0–8. Hodgson has a career-high ITF juniors ranking of 349, achieved on 21 March 2011.

== Davis Cup ==
=== Participations: (0–8) ===
Group membership World Group (0–0) WG Play-off (0–0) Group I (0–0) Group II (0–0) Group III (0–8) Group IV (0–0)	Matches by surface Hard (0–5) Clay (0–3) Grass (0–0) Carpet (0–0)	Matches by type Singles (0–7) Doubles (0–1)

- ▲ ▼ indicates the outcome of the Davis Cup match followed by the score, date, place of event, the zonal classification and its phase, and the court surface.

Rubber outcome	No.	Rubber	Match type (partner if any)	Opponent nation	Opponent player(s)	Score
▼0–3; 15 June 2011; Club de Tenis Santa Cruz, Santa Cruz, Bolivia; Americas Zone Group III Round Robin Pool B; Clay surface
Defeat	1	II	Singles	(The Bahamas) Bahamas	Marvin Rolle	3–6, 2–6
▼0–3; 16 June 2011; Club de Tenis Santa Cruz, Santa Cruz, Bolivia; Americas Zone Group III Round Robin Pool B; Clay surface
Defeat	2	II	Singles	Barbados	Darian King	1–6, 3–6
▲2–1; 16 June 2011; Club de Tenis Santa Cruz, Santa Cruz, Bolivia; Americas Zone Group III Round Robin Pool B; Clay surface
Defeat	3	II	Singles	Honduras	Keny Turcios	6–4, 3–6, 2–6
▼0–3; 18 June 2012; Shaw Park Tennis Facility, Tobago, Trinidad and Tobago; Americas Zone Group III Round Robin Pool A; Hard surface
Defeat	4	II	Singles	Trinidad and Tobago	Yohansey Williams	3–6, 2–6
▼1–2; 18 June 2012; Shaw Park Tennis Facility, Tobago, Trinidad and Tobago; Americas Zone Group III Round Robin Pool A; Hard surface
Defeat	5	II	Singles	Honduras	Ricardo Pineda	5–7, 2–6
▼0–3; 18 June 2012; Shaw Park Tennis Facility, Tobago, Trinidad and Tobago; Americas Zone Group III Round Robin Pool A; Hard surface
Defeat	6	II	Singles	Haiti	Olivier Sajous	3–6, 6–3, 1–6
▼0–3; 18 June 2012; Shaw Park Tennis Facility, Tobago, Trinidad and Tobago; Americas Zone Group III Round Robin Pool A; Hard surface
Defeat	7	II	Singles	Guatemala	Christopher Díaz Figueroa	0–6, 1–6
Defeat	8	III	Doubles (with Mitchell de Jong) (dead rubber)	Guatemala	Wilfredo González / Julen Urigüen	1–6, 2–6
