= 2024 Davis Cup Americas Zone Group III =

Davis Cup competition in 2024

The Americas Zone was the unique zone within Group 3 of the regional Davis Cup competition in 2024. The zone's competition was held in round robin format in Asunción, Paraguay, from 17 to 22 June 2024.

== Participating nations ==
- Bahamas
- Bermuda
- Costa Rica
- Dominican Republic
- Guatemala
- Jamaica
- Paraguay
- Puerto Rico
- Venezuela

== Draw ==
Date: 17–22 June 2024

Location: Club Internacional de Tenis, Asunción, Paraguay (Clay)

Format: Round-robin basis. One pool of four teams and one pool of five teams and nations will play each team once in their group. Nations finishing first in each group will be promoted to World Group II play-offs in 2025. Nations finishing second in each group will enter a promotion play-off and the winner will be promoted to World Group II play-offs in 2025.

Nations finishing fourth in each group will enter relegation play-off and the loser will be relegated to Americas Zone Group IV in 2025. They will be joined by the nation finishing fifth in Pool B.

=== Seeding ===
Pot	Nation	Rank^{1}	Seed
1	Paraguay	67	1
1	Jamaica	68	2
2	Dominican Republic	72	3
2	Costa Rica	74	4
3	Venezuela	76	5
3	Bermuda	83=	6
4	Guatemala	86	7
4	Puerto Rico	88	8
4	Bahamas	90=	9

- ^{1}Davis Cup Rankings as of 18 March 2024

=== Round Robin ===
==== Pool A ====
		PAR	VEN	CRC	BAH	RR; W–L	Set; W–L	Game; W–L	Standings
1	Paraguay		2–1	2–1	3–0	3–0	7–2 (%)	– (%)	1
5	Venezuela	1–2		3–0	3–0	2–1	7–2 (%)	– (%)	2
4	Costa Rica	1–2	0–3		2–1	1–2	3–6 (%)	– (%)	3
9	Bahamas	0–3	0–3	1–2		0–3	1–8 (%)	– (%)	4

==== Pool B ====
		DOM	PUR	BER	JAM	GUA	RR; W–L	Set; W–L	Game; W–L	Standings
3	Dominican Republic		3–0	3–0	2–1	2–1	4–0	10–2 (%)	– (%)	1
8	Puerto Rico	0–3		3–0	1–2	3–0	2–2	7–5 (%)	– (%)	2
6	Bermuda	0–3	0–3		2–1	2–1	2–2	4–8 (%)	– (%)	3
2	Jamaica	1–2	2–1	1–2		2–1	2–2	6–6 (%)	– (%)	4
7	Guatemala	1–2	0–3	1–2	1–2		0–4	3–9 (%)	– (%)	5

Standings are determined by: 1. number of wins; 2. number of matches; 3. in two-team ties, head-to-head records; 4. in three-team ties, (a) percentage of sets won (head-to-head records if two teams remain tied), then (b) percentage of games won (head-to-head records if two teams remain tied), then (c) Davis Cup rankings.

=== Playoffs ===
Placing	A Team	Score	B Team
First	Paraguay	0–2	Dominican Republic
Promotional	Venezuela	2–0	Puerto Rico
Fifth	Costa Rica	2–0	Bermuda
Relegation	Bahamas	0–2	Jamaica

- Dominican Republic, Paraguay and Venezuela were promoted to 2025 Davis Cup World Group II play-offs and Jamaica were also promoted as one of the four highest-ranked non-promoted teams in each 2024 Regional Group III event.
- Bahamas and Guatemala were relegated to 2025 Davis Cup Americas Zone Group IV.

== Round Robin ==
=== Pool A ===
==== Paraguay vs. Venezuela ====
Paraguay
2
Club Internacional de Tenis, Asunción, Paraguay
18 June 2024
Clay

Venezuela
1

			1	2	3
1	(Paraguay) (Venezuela)	Martin Antonio Vergara del Puerto; Brandon Perez	6; 1	5; 7	6; 2
2	(Paraguay) (Venezuela)	Daniel Vallejo; Ricardo Rodríguez-Pace	6; 2	6; 0
3	(Paraguay) (Venezuela)	Thiago Drozdowski / Hernando Jose Escurra Isnardi; Oscar Andres Martinez De Freitas / Sebastian Pino	6^{10} 7^{12}	6; 4	[9] [11]

==== Costa Rica vs. Bahamas ====
Costa Rica
2
Club Internacional de Tenis, Asunción, Paraguay
18 June 2024
Clay

Bahamas
1

			1	2	3
1	(Costa Rica) (The Bahamas)	Rodrigo Crespo Piedra; Michael Major Jr	4; 6	5; 7
2	(Costa Rica) (The Bahamas)	Christian Felipe Winstead; Justin Roberts	5; 7	6; 4	7^{7} 6^{5}
3	(Costa Rica) (The Bahamas)	Rodrigo Crespo Piedra / Paulo Pocasangre; Denali Nottage / Justin Roberts	6; 0	6; 2

==== Paraguay vs. Bahamas ====
Paraguay
3
Club Internacional de Tenis, Asunción, Paraguay
19 June 2024
Clay

Bahamas
0

			1	2	3
1	(Paraguay) (The Bahamas)	Martin Antonio Vergara del Puerto; Donte Armbrister	6; 3	6; 3
2	(Paraguay) (The Bahamas)	Daniel Vallejo; Justin Roberts	6; 4	6; 1
3	(Paraguay) (The Bahamas)	Thiago Drozdowski / Hernando Jose Escurra Isnardi; Michael Major Jr / Denali Nottage	6; 2	7; 5

==== Costa Rica vs. Venezuela ====
Costa Rica
0
Club Internacional de Tenis, Asunción, Paraguay
19 June 2024
Clay

Venezuela
3

			1	2	3
1	(Costa Rica) (Venezuela)	Rodrigo Crespo Piedra; Brandon Perez	6^{1} 7^{7}	3; 6
2	(Costa Rica) (Venezuela)	Christian Felipe Winstead; Ricardo Rodríguez-Pace	2; 6	6; 3	6^{2} 7^{7}
3	(Costa Rica) (Venezuela)	Luca Lo Nardo / Paulo Pocasangre; Brandon Perez / Ricardo Rodríguez-Pace	4; 6	1; 6

==== Paraguay vs. Costa Rica ====
Paraguay
2
Club Internacional de Tenis, Asunción, Paraguay
21 June 2024
Clay

Costa Rica
1

			1	2	3
1	(Paraguay) (Costa Rica)	Hernando Jose Escurra Isnardi; Rodrigo Crespo Piedra	6; 3	6; 3
2	(Paraguay) (Costa Rica)	Daniel Vallejo; Christian Felipe Winstead	6; 2	6; 2
3	(Paraguay) (Costa Rica)	Thiago Drozdowski / Martin Antonio Vergara del Puerto; Rodrigo Crespo Piedra / Christian Felipe Winstead	6^{6} 7^{8}	1; 4		retired

==== Venezuela vs. Bahamas ====
Venezuela
3
Club Internacional de Tenis, Asunción, Paraguay
21 June 2024
Clay

Bahamas
0

			1	2	3
1	(Venezuela) (The Bahamas)	Brandon Perez; Michael Major Jr	6; 4	6; 1
2	(Venezuela) (The Bahamas)	Ricardo Rodríguez-Pace; Justin Roberts	4; 6	6; 3	6; 4
3	(Venezuela) (The Bahamas)	Oscar Andres Martinez De Freitas / Sebastian Pino; Donte Armbrister / Denali Nottage	6; 3	6; 1

=== Pool B ===
==== Jamaica vs. Guatemala ====
Jamaica
2
Club Internacional de Tenis, Asunción, Paraguay
17 June 2024
Clay

Guatemala
1

			1	2	3
1	(Jamaica) (Guatemala)	John Chin; Gabriel Porras	6; 2	6; 1
2	(Jamaica) (Guatemala)	Blaise Bicknell; Kaeri Hernandez Mariona	6; 3	6; 1
3	(Jamaica) (Guatemala)	Daniel Azar / Keyon'dre St Clair Clarke; Kris Alessandro Hernandez Mariona / Kent Tagashira	4; 6	4; 6

==== Dominican Republic vs. Bermuda ====
Dominican Republic
3
Club Internacional de Tenis, Asunción, Paraguay
17 June 2024
Clay

Bermuda
0

			1	2	3
1	(Dominican Republic) (Bermuda)	Peter Bertran; Richard Mallory	6; 2	6; 2
2	(Dominican Republic) (Bermuda)	Roberto Cid Subervi; Daniel Phillips	6; 3	7^{7} 6^{4}
3	(Dominican Republic) (Bermuda)	Alejandro Jose Gandini / Antonio Matteo Laquinto Diaz; James Finnigan / Tariq Simmons	6; 2	7^{7} 6^{5}

==== Jamaica vs. Puerto Rico ====
Jamaica
2
Club Internacional de Tenis, Asunción, Paraguay
18 June 2024
Clay

Puerto Rico
1

			1	2	3
1	(Jamaica) (Puerto Rico)	John Chin; Jake Fellows	1; 6	4; 6
2	(Jamaica) (Puerto Rico)	Blaise Bicknell; Gabriel Evans	6; 4	6; 0
3	(Jamaica) (Puerto Rico)	Blaise Bicknell / John Chin; Jake Fellows / Noah Hernandez	6; 3	7; 5

==== Dominican Republic vs. Guatemala ====
Dominican Republic
2
Club Internacional de Tenis, Asunción, Paraguay
18 June 2024
Clay

Guatemala
1

			1	2	3
1	(Dominican Republic) (Guatemala)	Peter Bertran; Kris Alessandro Hernandez Mariona	6; 0	6; 1
2	(Dominican Republic) (Guatemala)	Roberto Cid Subervi; Kaeri Hernandez Mariona	6; 0	6; 2
3	(Dominican Republic) (Guatemala)	Alejandro Jose Gandini / Enmanuel Munoz; Juan Sebastian Dominguez Collado / Kent Tagashira	6; 3	3; 6	[5] [10]

==== Dominican Republic vs. Puerto Rico ====
Dominican Republic
3
Club Internacional de Tenis, Asunción, Paraguay
19 June 2024
Clay

Puerto Rico
0

			1	2	3
1	(Dominican Republic) (Puerto Rico)	Peter Bertran; Jake Fellows	6; 4	6; 2
2	(Dominican Republic) (Puerto Rico)	Roberto Cid Subervi; Gabriel Evans	7^{7} 6^{2}	6; 1
3	(Dominican Republic) (Puerto Rico)	Peter Bertran / Roberto Cid Subervi; Noah Hernandez / Luca Julian Hotze	6; 4	6; 2

==== Bermuda vs. Guatemala ====
Bermuda
2
Club Internacional de Tenis, Asunción, Paraguay
19 June 2024
Clay

Guatemala
1

			1	2	3
1	(Bermuda) (Guatemala)	Richard Mallory; Kaeri Hernandez Mariona	6; 0	6; 3
2	(Bermuda) (Guatemala)	Daniel Phillips; Juan Sebastian Dominguez Collado	6; 2	6; 2
3	(Bermuda) (Guatemala)	Jack Keyes / Tariq Simmons; Gabriel Porras / Kent Tagashira	3; 6	1; 6

==== Jamaica vs. Bermuda ====
Jamaica
1
Club Internacional de Tenis, Asunción, Paraguay
20 June 2024
Clay

Bermuda
2

			1	2	3
1	(Jamaica) (Bermuda)	John Chin; Daniel Phillips	1; 6	6; 0	4; 6
2	(Jamaica) (Bermuda)	Blaise Bicknell; Tariq Simmons	6; 2	6; 0
3	(Jamaica) (Bermuda)	Blaise Bicknell / John Chin; Richard Mallory / Daniel Phillips	4; 6	2; 6

==== Guatemala vs. Puerto Rico ====
Guatemala
0
Club Internacional de Tenis, Asunción, Paraguay
20 June 2024
Clay

Puerto Rico
3

			1	2	3
1	(Guatemala) (Puerto Rico)	Kaeri Hernandez Mariona; Marko Mesarovic	3; 6	1; 6
2	(Guatemala) (Puerto Rico)	Juan Sebastian Dominguez Collado; Gabriel Evans	7^{7} 6^{0}	6^{1} 7^{7}	0; 6
3	(Guatemala) (Puerto Rico)	Kris Alessandro Hernandez Mariona / Kent Tagashira; Noah Hernandez / Marko Mesarovic	3; 6	4; 6

==== Jamaica vs. Dominican Republic ====
Jamaica
1
Club Internacional de Tenis, Asunción, Paraguay
21 June 2024
Clay

Dominican Republic
2

			1	2	3
1	(Jamaica) (Dominican Republic)	John Chin; Peter Bertran	1; 6	1; 6
2	(Jamaica) (Dominican Republic)	Blaise Bicknell; Roberto Cid Subervi	4; 6	2; 6
3	(Jamaica) (Dominican Republic)	Blaise Bicknell / John Chin; Alejandro Jose Gandini / Antonio Matteo Laquinto Diaz	6; 3	3; 6	[10] [5]

==== Bermuda vs. Puerto Rico ====
Bermuda
0
Club Internacional de Tenis, Asunción, Paraguay
21 June 2024
Clay

Puerto Rico
3

			1	2	3
1	(Bermuda) (Puerto Rico)	Richard Mallory; Jake Fellows	7^{7} 6^{5}	1; 6	2; 6
2	(Bermuda) (Puerto Rico)	Daniel Phillips; Marko Mesarovic	4; 6	2; 6
3	(Bermuda) (Puerto Rico)	James Finnigan / Jack Keyes; Jake Fellows / Noah Hernandez	2; 6	4; 6

== Play-offs ==
=== First place play-off ===
==== Paraguay vs. Dominican Republic ====
Paraguay
0
Club Internacional de Tenis, Asunción, Paraguay
22 June 2024
Clay

Dominican Republic
2

			1	2	3
1	(Paraguay) (Dominican Republic)	Hernando Jose Escurra Isnardi; Peter Bertran	4; 6	3; 6
2	(Paraguay) (Dominican Republic)	Daniel Vallejo; Roberto Cid Subervi	4; 6	3; 6
3	(Paraguay) (Dominican Republic)	Daniel Vallejo / Martin Antonio Vergara del Puerto; Peter Bertran / Roberto Cid Subervi				not played

=== Promotional play-off ===
==== Venezuela vs. Puerto Rico ====
Venezuela
2
Club Internacional de Tenis, Asunción, Paraguay
22 June 2024
Clay

Puerto Rico
0

			1	2	3
1	(Venezuela) (Puerto Rico)	Brandon Perez; Marko Mesarovic	6; 4	1; 6	6; 3
2	(Venezuela) (Puerto Rico)	Ricardo Rodríguez-Pace; Gabriel Evans	6; 4	6; 0
3	(Venezuela) (Puerto Rico)	Brandon Perez / Ricardo Rodríguez-Pace; Jake Fellows / Noah Hernandez				not played

=== Fifth place play-off ===
==== Costa Rica vs. Bermuda ====
Costa Rica
2
Club Internacional de Tenis, Asunción, Paraguay
22 June 2024
Clay

Bermuda
0

			1	2	3
1	(Costa Rica) (Bermuda)	Rodrigo Crespo Piedra; Richard Mallory	6; 1	6; 4
2	(Costa Rica) (Bermuda)	Christian Felipe Winstead; Tariq Simmons	6; 3	7; 5
3	(Costa Rica) (Bermuda)	Rodrigo Crespo Piedra / Christian Felipe Winstead; Richard Mallory / Daniel Phillips				not played

=== Relegation play-off ===
==== Bahamas vs. Jamaica ====
Bahamas
0
Club Internacional de Tenis, Asunción, Paraguay
22 June 2024
Clay

Jamaica
2

			1	2	3
1	(The Bahamas) (Jamaica)	Michael Major Jr; John Chin	4; 6	3; 6
2	(The Bahamas) (Jamaica)	Justin Roberts; Blaise Bicknell	3; 6	4; 6
3	(The Bahamas) (Jamaica)	Denali Nottage / Justin Roberts; Blaise Bicknell / John Chin				not played

== Final placements ==
Placing	Teams
Promoted/First	Dominican Republic
Promoted/Second	Paraguay
Promoted/Third	Venezuela
Fourth	Puerto Rico
Fifth	Costa Rica
Sixth	Bermuda
Seventh	Jamaica
Relegated/Eighth	Bahamas
Relegated/Ninth	Guatemala

- Dominican Republic, Paraguay and Venezuela were promoted to 2025 Davis Cup World Group II play-offs and Jamaica were also promoted as one of the four highest-ranked non-promoted teams in each 2024 Regional Group III event.
- Bahamas and Guatemala were relegated to 2025 Davis Cup Americas Zone Group IV.
