= Blaise Bicknell =

Jamaican tennis player (born 2001)

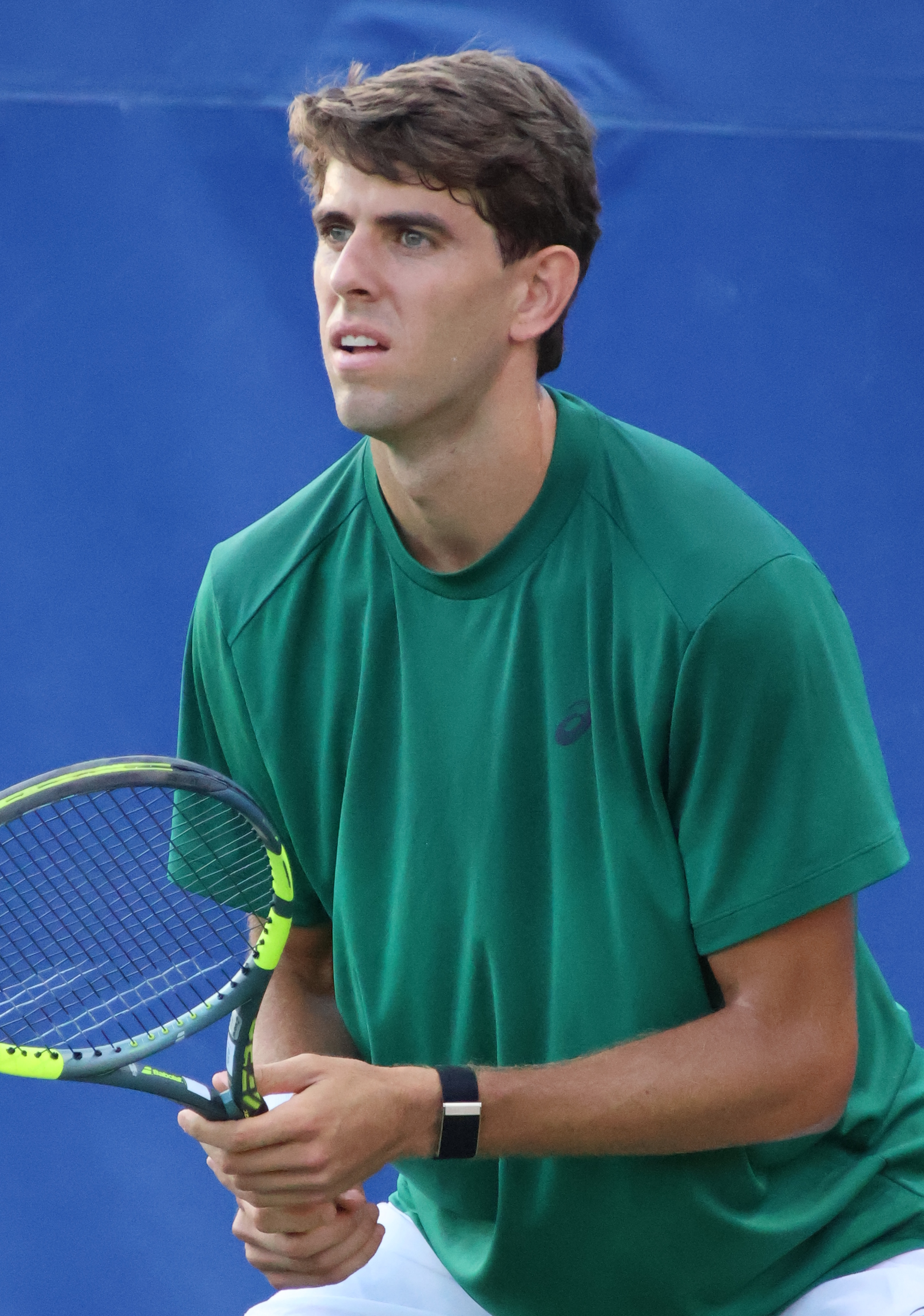
- Bicknell in 2026
- Country (sports): United States; Jamaica (In Davis Cup)
- Residence: Miami, Florida, US
- Born: 26 November 2001 (age 24) Kingston, Jamaica
- Height: 1.91 m (6 ft 3 in)
- Plays: Right-handed (two-handed backhand)
- College: Tennessee
- Coach: Melville Spence
- Prize money: US $121,318

Singles
- Career record: 8–5 (at ATP Tour level, Grand Slam level, and in Davis Cup)
- Career titles: 0; 1 Challenger, 4 ITF World Tennis Tour
- Highest ranking: No. 306 (27 May 2024)
- Current ranking: No. 395 (9 November 2026)

Grand Slam singles results
- Australian Open Junior: Q2 (2019)
- Wimbledon Junior: Q1 (2019)
- US Open Junior: 1R (2019)

Doubles
- Career record: 0–4 (at ATP Tour level, Grand Slam level, and in Davis Cup)
- Career titles: 0; 0 Challenger, 0 ITF World Tennis Tour
- Highest ranking: No. 1,211 (8 August 2022)

Grand Slam doubles results
- US Open Junior: 1R (2019)

Team competitions
- Davis Cup: 27–14
- Last updated on: 9 November 2026.

Blaise Bicknell (born 26 November 2001) is an American–Jamaican tennis player. He has a career high ATP singles ranking of world No. 306 achieved on 27 May 2024 and a career high doubles ranking of No. 1,211 achieved on 8 August 2022. Bicknell has a career high ITF juniors ranking of No. 96 achieved on 8 April 2019.

Bicknell has represented Jamaica at the Davis Cup.

== College career ==
A member of the University of Florida team since 2019, Bicknell transferred to the University of Tennessee in the fall of 2021.

== Professional career ==
He won his first Challenger title at the 2024 Southern California Open II in Indian Wells defeating Zachary Svajda.

He received a wildcard for the qualifying competition at the 2024 Miami Open but lost to Arthur Rinderknech in the first round.

== Challenger and World Tennis Tour Finals ==
=== Singles: 9 (5–4) ===
Legend
ATP Challenger Tour (1–1)
ITF World Tennis Tour (4–3)

Titles by surface
Hard (5–3)
Clay (0–1)
Grass (0–0)
Carpet (0–0)

Result	W–L	Date	Tournament	Tier	Surface	Opponent	Score
Loss	0–1	Sep 2022	M15 Lubbock, United States	World Tennis Tour	Hard	(Sweden) Olle Wallin	4–6, 2–6
Loss	0–2	Jun 2023	M15 San Diego, United States	World Tennis Tour	Hard	(Italy) Lorenzo Claverie	6–3, 5–7, 2–6
Win	1–2	Jul 2023	M25 Laval, Canada	World Tennis Tour	Hard	(United States) James Tracy	3–6, 6–3, 6–4
Loss	1–3	Aug 2023	Lima, Peru	Challenger	Clay	(Ecuador) Álvaro Guillén Meza	6–7^{(3–7)}, 1–6
Win	2–3	Jan 2024	Indian Wells, USA	Challenger	Hard	(United States) Zachary Svajda	6–3, 6–2
Win	3–3	Jul 2025	M25 Laval, Canada	World Tennis Tour	Hard	(Canada) Justin Boulais	3–6, 7–6^{(7–5)}, 7–6^{(7–5)}
Loss	3–4	Jul 2025	M25 Champaign, United States	World Tennis Tour	Hard	(United Kingdom) Paul Jubb	1–6, 6–7^{(4–7)}
Win	4–4	Feb 2026	M15 San José, Costa Rica	World Tennis Tour	Hard	(Dominican Republic) Nick Hardt	6–2, 6–4
Win	5–4	Mar 2026	M25 Las Vegas, United States	World Tennis Tour	Hard	(United States) Ronit Karki	6–3, 6–2

=== Doubles 1 (0–1) ===
Legend (doubles) ATP Challenger Tour (0–0) ITF World Tennis Tour (0–1)	Titles by surface Hard (0–1) Clay (0–0) Grass (0–0) Carpet (0–0)

Result	W–L	Date	Tournament	Tier	Surface	Partner	Opponents	Score
Loss	0–1	Jun 2023	M15 South Bend, United States	World Tennis Tour	Hard	(Jamaica) John Chin	(Colombia) Andrei Duarte (United States) Ryan Fishback	4–6, 2–6

== Davis Cup ==
=== Participations: (13–5) ===
Group membership World Group (0–0) WG Play-off (0–0) Group I (0–0) Group II (4–4) Group III (9–1) Group IV (0–0)	Matches by surface Hard (7–3) Clay (6–2) Grass (0–0) Carpet (0–0)	Matches by type Singles (11–3) Doubles (2–2)

- ▲ ▼ indicates the outcome of the Davis Cup match followed by the score, date, place of event, the zonal classification and its phase, and the court surface.

Rubber outcome	No.	Rubber	Match type (partner if any)	Opponent nation	Opponent player(s)	Score
▼1–3; 6–7 March 2020; Complejo Polideportivo de Ciudad Merliot, Santa Tecla, El Salvador; World Group II Play-off First round; Hard surface
Victory	1	I	Singles	El Salvador	Alberto Alvarado	6–3, 6–2
Defeat	2	III	Doubles (with Rowland Phillips)	El Salvador	Marcelo Arévalo / Lluis Miralles	3–6, 2–6
Defeat	3	IV	Singles	El Salvador	Marcelo Arévalo	4–6, 6–7^{(5–7)}
▲3–0; 30 June 2021; Centro de Alto Rendimiento Fred Maduro, Panama City, Panama; Americas Zone Group III Round robin; Clay surface
Victory	4	II	Singles	(United States Virgin Islands) U.S. Virgin Islands	Tomas del Olmo	6–2, 6–3
▲3–0; 1 July 2021; Centro de Alto Rendimiento Fred Maduro, Panama City, Panama; Americas Zone Group III Round robin; Clay surface
Victory	5	II	Singles	Panama	José Gilbert Gómez	6–3, 6–4
Victory	6	III	Doubles (with Rowland Phillips) (dead rubber)	Panama	José Gilbert Gómez / Luis Gómez	6–3, 6–2
▲2–1; 2 July 2021; Centro de Alto Rendimiento Fred Maduro, Panama City, Panama; Americas Zone Group III Round robin; Clay surface
Victory	7	II	Singles	Puerto Rico	Quinton Vega	6–4, 6–1
▲2–0; 3 July 2021; Centro de Alto Rendimiento Fred Maduro, Panama City, Panama; Americas Zone Group III Promotional play-off; Clay surface
Victory	8	II	Singles	(The Bahamas) Bahamas	Justin Roberts	2–6, 6–3, 6–4
▼2–3; 4–5 March 2022; Ace Tennis Club, Athens, Greece; World Group II Play-off First round; Clay (i) surface
Victory	9	II	Singles	Greece	Petros Tsitsipas	6–3, 7–5
Defeat	10	III	Doubles (with Rowland Phillips)	Greece	Markos Kalovelonis / Petros Tsitsipas	2–6, 3–6
Defeat	11	IV	Singles	Greece	Aristotelis Thanos	4–6, 4–6
▲2–1; 22 June 2022; Costa Rica Country Club, Escazú, Costa Rica; Americas Zone Group III Round robin; Hard surface
Victory	12	II	Singles	Costa Rica	Jesse Flores	6–3, 6–1
▲2–1; 23 June 2022; Costa Rica Country Club, Escazú, Costa Rica; Americas Zone Group III Round robin; Hard surface
Victory	13	II	Singles	(The Bahamas) Bahamas	Spencer Newman	6–2, 6–1
▼1–2; 24 June 2022; Costa Rica Country Club, Escazú, Costa Rica; Americas Zone Group III Round robin; Hard surface
Defeat	14	II	Singles	Paraguay	Daniel Vallejo	6–7^{(6–8)}, 7–6^{(9–7)}, 3–6
▲3–0; 25 June 2022; Costa Rica Country Club, Escazú, Costa Rica; Americas Zone Group III Promotional play-off; Hard surface
Victory	15	II	Singles	Panama	José Gilbert Gómez	6–0, 6–1
Victory	16	III	Doubles (with Daniel Azar) (dead rubber)	Panama	Marcelo Rodríguez / Chad Valdés	6–2, 6–4
▲3–2; 4–5 February 2023; Eric Bell National Tennis Centre, Kingston, Jamaica; World Group II Play-off First round; Hard surface
Victory	17	II	Singles	Estonia	Kenneth Raisma	4–6, 6–4, 6–0
Victory	18	IV	Singles	Estonia	Kristjan Tamm	7–6^{(9–7)} def. (Note: Tamm after tie-break hit the centre-line judge out of frustration and picking up a default.)
