= Nicaragua Davis Cup team =

National tennis team

Nicaragua
- First year: 2022
- Years played: 1
- Ties played (W–L): 5 (3–2)
- Best finish: Zonal Group III RR
- Most total wins: Joaquín Guilleme (4–1)
- Most singles wins: Joaquín Guilleme (4–0)
- Most doubles wins: Luis Márquez (1–2)
- Most ties played: Luis Márquez (5)
- Most years played: Francisco Bendaña, Luis Márquez, Joaquín Guilleme, Alfredo Gallegos (1)

The Nicaragua Davis Cup team represents Nicaragua in Davis Cup tennis competition and are governed by the Federación Nicaragüense de Tenis. They currently compete in the Americas Zone of Group IV.

== History ==
Nicaragua competed in its first Davis Cup in 2022.

== Players ==
Player	W-L (Total)	W-L (Singles)	W-L (Doubles)	Ties	Debut	Ref
Francisco Bendaña	2–3	2–1	0–2	4	2022	
Alfredo Gallegos	2–1	1–0	1–1	2	2022	
Joaquín Guilleme	4–1	4–0	0–1	4	2022	
Luis Márquez	2–3	1–1	1–2	5	2022	

== Recent performances ==
Here is the list of all match-ups of Nicaragua participation in the Davis Cup in 2022.

Year	Competition	Date	Surface	Venue	Opponent	Score	Result
2022	Americas Zone Group IV, Pool B	2 August	Hard	National Racquet Centre (TTO)	U.S. Virgin Islands	3–0	Win
2022	Americas Zone Group IV, Pool B	3 August	Hard	National Racquet Centre (TTO)	Cuba	1–2	Loss
2022	Americas Zone Group IV, Pool B	4 August	Hard	National Racquet Centre (TTO)	Trinidad and Tobago	2–1	Win
2022	Americas Zone Group IV, Pool B	5 August	Hard	National Racquet Centre (TTO)	Aruba	1–2	Loss
2022	Americas Zone Group IV, 5th place play-off	6 August	Hard	National Racquet Centre (TTO)	Antigua and Barbuda	2–0	Win

== See also ==
- Davis Cup
