= Tacarigua, Trinidad and Tobago =

Tacarigua San Pablo de Tacarigua
- Town
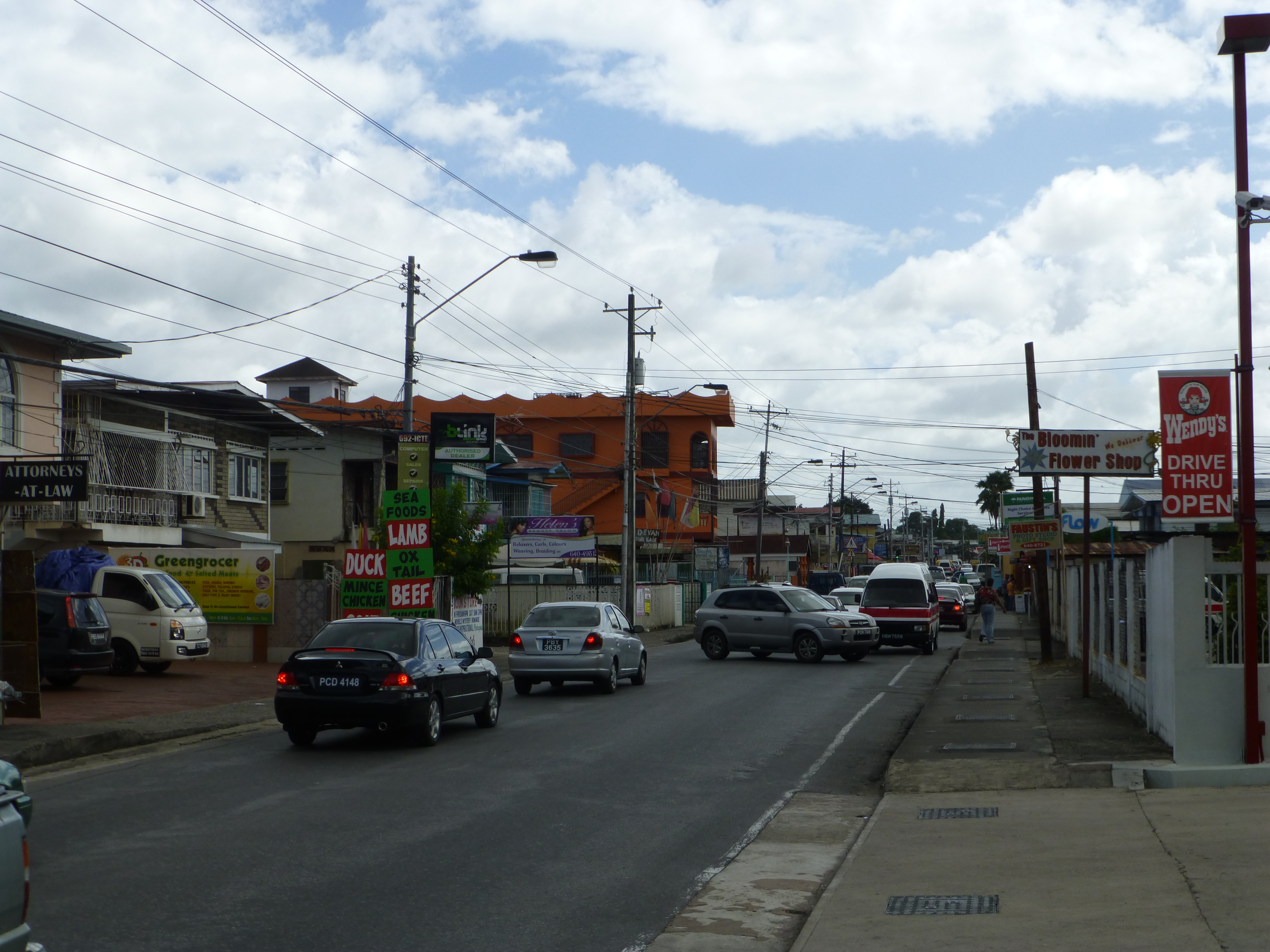
- Eastern Main Road, Tacarigua, in 2014
- Interactive map of Tacarigua
- Coordinates: 10°38′37.047″N 61°21′39.878″W
- Country: Trinidad and Tobago
- Region: Tunapuna-Piarco
- Settled: c. 1595

Population (2011)
  - Total: 4,752
- Demonym: Tacariguan
- Time zone: UTC−4 (AST)
- Postal Code: 34xxxx
- Area codes: 868

Tacarigua (originally San Pablo de Tacarigua) is a town in the East–West Corridor of Trinidad and Tobago. It is located east of Tunapuna, north of Trincity and west of Arouca. It is on the banks of the Tacarigua River. The city is governed by the Tunapuna–Piarco Regional Corporation.

Tacarigua was originally a Spanish encomienda, prior to the relocation of the Amerindians to Arima in 1789. Some of the first mosques in the region were built at Tacarigua in 1850. West Indian cricket player Kieron Pollard was born there in 1987.

There is a multisport facility in Tacarigua, the Racquet Sport Centre, which has been host to local and international tournaments in tennis, table tennis and badminton. The 2018 Pan Am Badminton Championships and the 2017 & 2023 Carebaco Games were held there. The regular Trinidad and Tobago hockey season was restarted in 2025, being held at Tacarigua.
