= Aruba Davis Cup team =

National tennis team

Aruba
- First year: 2007
- Years played: 7
- Ties played (W–L): 30 (14–15)
- Best finish: Zonal Group III RR
- Most total wins: Gian Hodgson (16–24)
- Most singles wins: Gian Hodgson (10–14)
- Most doubles wins: Gian Hodgson (6–10)
- Best doubles team: Frederick Sydow & Patrick Sydow (4–1)
- Most ties played: Gian Hodgson (25)
- Most years played: Gian Hodgson (6)

The Aruba Davis Cup team represents Aruba in Davis Cup tennis competition and are governed by the Aruba Lawn Tennis Bond. They currently compete in the Americas Zone of Group IV.

== History ==
Aruba competed in its first Davis Cup in 2007.

== Players ==
Player (Note: Active players in boldface)	W-L (Total)	W-L (Singles)	W-L (Doubles)	Ties	Debut	Ref
Mitchell de Jong	4–15	1–6	3–9	18	2008	
Sjoerd de Vries	2–1		2–1	3	2007	
Clifford Giel	7–5	4–2	3–3	6	2007	
Gian Hodgson	16–24	10–14	6–10	25	2007	
Ibian Hodgson	0–8	0–7	0–1	8	2011	
Frederick Sydow	7–3	3–2	4–1	5	2022	
Patrick Sydow	8–2	4–1	4–1	5	2022	
Abetti Thiel	0–5	0–2	0–3	4	2008	
Harry van Reek	4–1	0–1	4–0	4	2009	
Ricardo Velasquez	0–2	0–1	0–1	1	2010	

Other player called:

- Noah Muyale (2022)

== Recent performances ==
Here is the list of all match-ups of Aruba participation in the Davis Cup in 2022.

Year	Competition	Date	Surface	Venue	Opponent	Score	Result
2022	Americas Zone Group IV, Pool B	1 August	Hard	National Racquet Centre (TTO)	Trinidad and Tobago	3–0	Win
2022	Americas Zone Group IV, Pool B	3 August	Hard	National Racquet Centre (TTO)	U.S. Virgin Islands	3–0	Win
2022	Americas Zone Group IV, Pool B	4 August	Hard	National Racquet Centre (TTO)	Cuba	2–1	Win
2022	Americas Zone Group IV, Pool B	5 August	Hard	National Racquet Centre (TTO)	Nicaragua	2–1	Win
2022	Americas Zone Group IV, Promotional play-off	6 August	Hard	National Racquet Centre (TTO)	Honduras	1–2	Loss

== See also ==
- Davis Cup
- Aruba Billie Jean King Cup team
