= Sebastien Vidal =

Guatemalan tennis player

- Country (sports): Guatemala
- Born: 9 December 1989 (age 35); Guatemala City, Guatemala
- Height: 5 ft 11 in (180 cm)
- Plays: Right-handed

Singles
- Career record: 6–4 (Davis Cup)
- Highest ranking: No. 1136 (18 Jun 2012)

Doubles
- Career record: 8–5 (Davis Cup)
- Highest ranking: No. 931 (4 Feb 2013)

Sebastien Albric Havard Vidal Walters (born 9 December 1989) is a Guatemalan former professional tennis player.

Born in Guatemala City and of French and Welsh descent, Vidal played in 20 Davis Cup ties for Guatemala from 2007 to 2014, winning six singles and eight doubles rubbers. During this time he was also a student at the College of William and Mary in Virginia and spent four seasons in collegiate tennis, which included appearing in the NCAA Division I Championships.

Vidal represented Guatemala in the 2007 and 2011 editions of the Pan American Games. In the 2007 Pan American Games he won his first round singles match over college teammate Dominic Pagon of Jamaica, before falling to eventual gold medalist Flávio Saretta. He also competed at the 2010 Central American and Caribbean Games.
