= Olivier Sajous =

Haitian tennis player

- Country (sports): Haiti
- Born: 4 February 1987 (age 39) Port-au-Prince, Haiti
- Plays: Right-handed (two-handed backhand)
- Prize money: $20,519

Singles
- Career record: 16–11 (at ATP Tour level, Grand Slam level, and in Davis Cup)
- Career titles: 0
- Highest ranking: No. 508 (9 May 2011)

Doubles
- Career record: 6–5 (at ATP Tour level, Grand Slam level, and in Davis Cup)
- Career titles: 0
- Highest ranking: No. 996 (15 November 2010)
- Last updated on: 25 June 2018.

Olivier Sajous (born 4 February 1987) is a Haitian tennis player.

Sajous has a career high ATP singles ranking of 508 achieved on 9 May 2011. He also has a career high ATP doubles ranking of 996 achieved on 15 November 2010.

Sajous represented Haiti at the Davis Cup, where he had a W/L record of 22–16.

== Future and Challenger finals ==
=== Singles: 1 (0–1) ===
| Legend (singles) ATP Challenger Tour (0–0) ITF Futures Tour (0–1) | Titles by surface Hard (0–0) Clay (0–1) Grass (0–0) Carpet (0–0) |

| Result | W–L | Date | Tournament | Tier | Surface | Opponent | Score |
|---|---|---|---|---|---|---|---|
| Loss | 0–1 | Jan 2011 | United States F1, Plantation | Futures | Clay | (Slovenia) Luka Gregorc | 6–3, 2–6, 0–6 |

=== Doubles 1 (0–1) ===
| Legend (doubles) ATP Challenger Tour (0–0) ITF Futures Tour (0–1) | Titles by surface Hard (0–0) Clay (0–1) Grass (0–0) Carpet (0–0) |

| Result | W–L | Date | Tournament | Tier | Surface | Partner | Opponents | Score |
|---|---|---|---|---|---|---|---|---|
| Loss | 0–1 | May 2012 | United States F13, Tampa | Futures | Clay | (Barbados) Haydn Lewis | (Canada) Philip Bester (Canada) Kamil Pajkowski | 6–7^{(6–8)}, 1–6 |
