= Dominic Pagon =

Jamaican tennis player (born 1988)

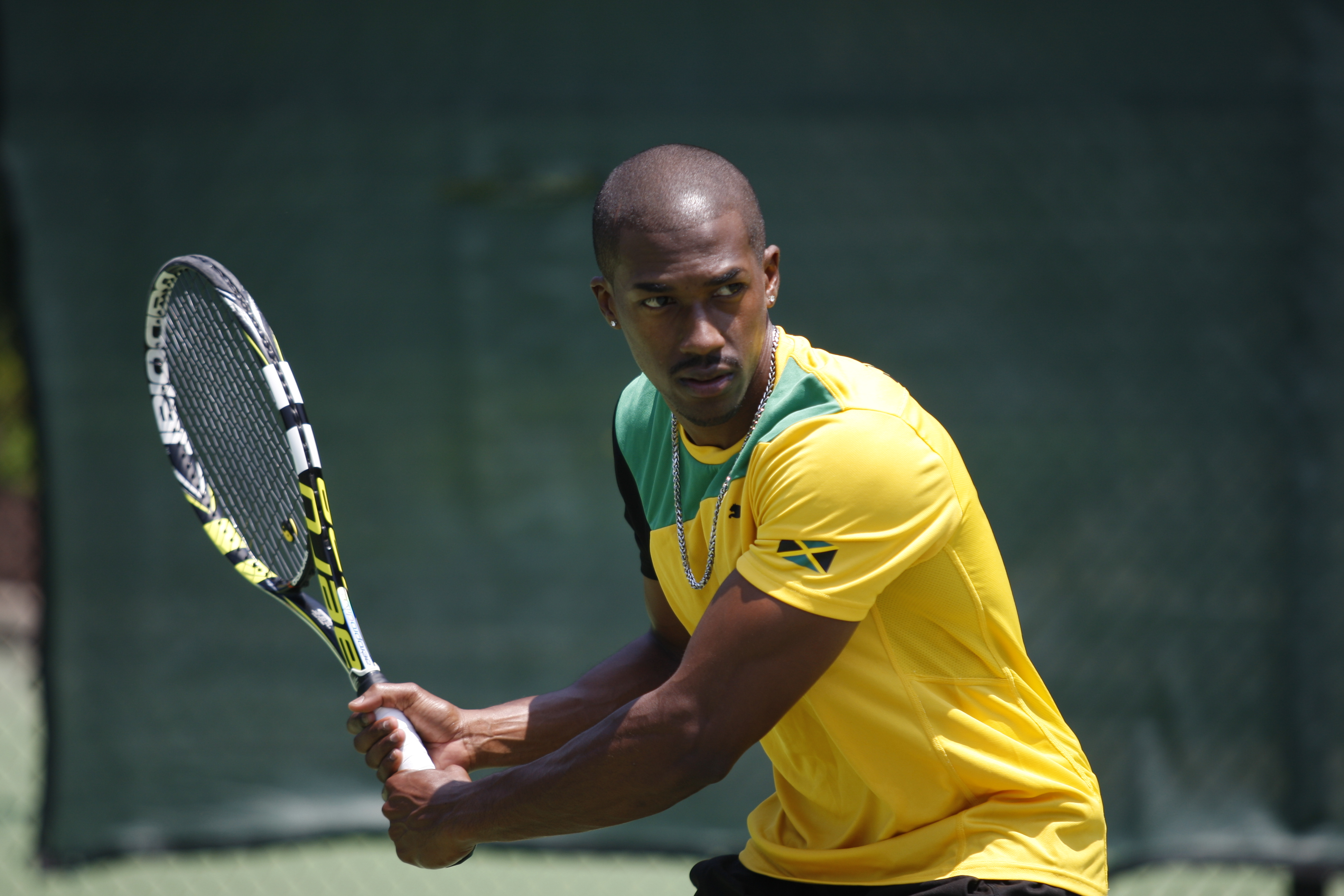
- Dominic Pagon, Team Jamaica
- Country (sports): Jamaica
- Residence: Kingston, Jamaica
- Born: 8 March 1988 (age 38) Kingston, Jamaica
- Height: 1.75 m (5 ft 9 in)
- Turned pro: 2008
- Plays: Left-handed

Singles
- Career record: 6-12

Doubles
- Career record: 12-8

Dominic Pagon (born March 8, 1988) is a Jamaican professional tennis player.

== Playing career ==
Pagon has an International Tennis Federation win–loss record of 21–28 primarily through his Davis Cup exploits. He has represented Jamaica in the Davis Cup on seven occasions and was nominated as the country’s No. 1 player in 2008, 2009, 2013, 2014 and 2016. He has been selected to be the Captain for the Jamaican Davis Cup Team on four occasions (2013, 2016, 2018 & 2019) and has 18 wins overall. In June 2019, Pagon broke the record for most doubles wins in the history of Jamaica's Davis Cup tennis with 12 wins. He has played two ATP International Series singles event, both at the International Tennis Hall of Fame Champions Cup in 2007 & 2008. Pagon represented Jamaica at the 2006 Central American and Caribbean Games, 2007 Pan American Games and was a doubles quarter finalist at the 2014 Central American and Caribbean Games in Mexico. He was the top-ranked junior player in the Caribbean and Central American region as well as his home country. Pagon achieved a career-best ITF Junior Circuit ranking of No. 125. Pagon went to The College of William & Mary and earned All-Colonial Athletic Association honors three times as a Tribe player. He was named team captain in 2008 and won 55 singles and 47 doubles matches for W&M.

== Davis Cup ==
=== Participations: (18–20) ===
| Group membership World Group (0–0) WG Play-off (0–0) Group I (0–0) Group II (0–2) Group III (15–16) Group IV (0–0) | Matches by surface Hard (14–17) Clay (4–3) Grass (0–0) Carpet (0–0) | Matches by type Singles (6–12) Doubles (12–8) |

- ▲ ▼ indicates the outcome of the Davis Cup match followed by the score, date, place of event, the zonal classification and its phase, and the court surface.

| Rubber outcome | No. | Rubber | Match type (partner if any) | Opponent nation | Opponent player(s) | Score |
▲3-0; 16-20 July 2008; Country Club, Tegucigalpa, Honduras; Americas Round Robin; Hard surface
| Victory | 1 | II | Singles | Honduras | Keny Turcios | 6–0, 7–5 |
▼1–2; 16-20 July 2008; Country Club, Tegucigalpa, Honduras; Americas Round Robin; Hard surface
| Defeat | 2 | II | Singles | Barbados | Haydn Lewis | 6–7, 4–6 |
▲2–1; 16-20 July 2008; Country Club, Tegucigalpa, Honduras; Americas Round Robin; Hard surface
| Victory | 3 | II | Singles | Guatemala | Cristian Paiz | 6–3, 2-6, 7-6 |
▲2–1; 16-20 July 2008; Country Club, Tegucigalpa, Honduras; Americas Promotion Playoff; Hard surface
| Defeat | 4 | II | Singles | Puerto Rico | Alex Llompart | 2-6, 2-6 |
▼0–5; 10–12 July 2009; S.O.V Asiento, Curacao, Netherlands Antilles; Americas Relegation Playoff; Hard surface
| Defeat | 5 | II | Singles | Netherlands Antilles | Romano Tatuhey | 1-6, 3-6, 4-6 |
| Defeat | 6 | III | Doubles (with Tyler Chin) | Netherlands Antilles | Romano Tatuhey / Martijn Cav Haasteren | 1-6, 1-6, 4-6 |
▲2–1; 07 July 2010; San Juan, Puerto Rico; Americas Round Robin; Hard surface
| Defeat | 7 | I | Singles | Aruba | Clifford Giel | 6-3, 2-6, 4-6 |
| Victory | 8 | III | Doubles (with Damion Johnson) | Aruba | Clifford Giel / Gian Hodgson | 4-6, 7-5, 7-5 |
▼0-3; 07 July 2010; San Juan, Puerto Rico; Americas Round Robin; Hard surface
| Defeat | 9 | III | Doubles (with Dwayne Pagon) | (The Bahamas) Bahamas | Devin Mullings / Marvin Rolle | 4-6, 1-6 |
▼0–3; 07 July 2010; San Juan, Puerto Rico; Americas Playoff; Hard surface
| Defeat | 10 | I | Singles | Puerto Rico | Ricardo Gonzalez-Diaz | 1–6, 2-6 |
| Defeat | 11 | III | Doubles (with Damion Johnson) | Puerto Rico | Alex Llompart / Jose Perdomo | 0-6, 4-6 |
▼1–2; 18 June 2012; Tobago, Trinidad & Tobago; Americas Round Robin; Hard surface
| Defeat | 12 | I | Singles | Costa Rica | Pablo Nunez | 4-6, 5-7 |
| Victory | 13 | III | Doubles (with Brandon Burke) | Costa Rica | Pable Nunez / Ignaci Roca | 6-2, 6-0 |
▲2–1; 18 June 2012; Tobago, Trinidad & Tobago; Americas Round Robin; Hard surface
| Victory | 14 | I | Singles | (The Bahamas) Bahamas | Rodney Carey | 6–4, 1-6, 7-6 |
| Victory | 15 | III | Doubles (with Brandon Burke) | (The Bahamas) Bahamas | Marvin Rolle / Rodney Carey | 6-3, 1-6, 6-3 |
▲3–0; 18 June 2012; Tobago, Trinidad & Tobago; Americas Round Robin; Hard surface
| Victory | 16 | I | Singles | (Saint Vincent and the Grenadines) US Virgin Islands | Nicholas Bass | 6-0, 6-1 |
| Victory | 17 | III | Doubles (with Dwayne Pagon) | (Saint Vincent and the Grenadines) US Virgin Islands | Kristepher Elien / Kevin Alric Plaskett | 7–6, 6-0 |
▲2–1; 18 June 2012; Tobago, Trinidad & Tobago; Americas Round Robin; Hard surface
| Defeat | 18 | I | Singles | Panama | Walner Espinoza | 4-6, 3-6 |
| Victory | 19 | III | Doubles (with Brandon Burke) | Panama | Walner Espinoza / Juan-Jose Fuentes | 6-1, 6-2 |
▼0–3; 17 June 2013; Club de Tenis La Paz, La Paz, Bolivia; Americas Round Robin; Clay surface
| Defeat | 20 | II | Singles | Bolivia | Hugo Dellien | 4-6, 1-6 |
▲2–1; 17 June 2013; Club de Tenis La Paz, La Paz, Bolivia; Americas Round Robin; Clay surface
| Victory | 21 | II | Singles | Cuba | William Dorantes Sanchez | 6-1, 6-2 |
| Victory | 22 | III | Doubles (with Brandon Burke) | Cuba | Randy Blanco / Roberto Cruz Ramos | 4-6, 6-3, 7-6 |
▼0-3; 17 June 2013; Club de Tenis La Paz, La Paz, Bolivia; Americas Playoff; Clay surface
| Defeat | 23 | II | Singles | Paraguay | Juan Borba | 0-6, 4-6 |
▼0-3; 12 July 2014; Palmas Athletic Club, Humacao, Puerto Rico; Americas Round Robin; Hard surface
| Defeat | 24 | II | Singles | Puerto Rico | Alex Llompart | 3-6, 2-6 |
| Defeat | 25 | III | Doubles (with Daniel Harris) | Puerto Rico | Alex Llompart / Gilberto Alvarez | 2-6, 4-6 |
▲2–1; 12 July 2014; Palmas Athletic Club, Humacao, Puerto Rico; Americas Round Robin; Hard surface
| Defeat | 26 | II | Singles | Trinidad and Tobago | Vaughn Wilson | 6–4, 2-6, 4-6 |
| Victory | 27 | III | Doubles (with Brandon Burke) | Trinidad and Tobago | Akiel Duke / Vaughn Wilson | 7-5, 6-3 |
▼0-3; 12 July 2014; Palmas Athletic Club, Humacao, Puerto Rico; Americas Round Robin; Hard surface
| Defeat | 28 | II | Singles | Costa Rica | Pablo Núñez | 2-6, 5-7 |
▼1-2; 12 July 2014; Palmas Athletic Club, Humacao, Puerto Rico; Americas Round Robin; Hard surface
| Victory | 29 | II | Singles | Bermuda | David Thomas | 6-3, 4-6, 7-6 |
| Defeat | 30 | III | Doubles (with Brandon Burke) | Bermuda | Jenson Bascome / Neal Towlson | 1-6, 2-6 |
▲3-0; 11 July 2016; Club de Tenis La Paz, La Paz, Bolivia; Americas Round Robin; Clay surface
| Victory | 31 | III | Doubles (with Rowland Phillips) | Cuba | Cristian Rodriguez / Osmel Rivera Granja | 2-6, 6-3, 6-2 |
▲3-0; 11 July 2016; Club de Tenis La Paz, La Paz, Bolivia; Americas Round Robin; Clay surface
| Victory | 32 | III | Doubles (with Rowland Phillips) | Panama | Brendan Cockburn / Alejandro Benitez | 6-0, 6-1 |
▼0-3; 11 July 2016; Club de Tenis La Paz, La Paz, Bolivia; Americas Round Robin; Clay surface
| Defeat | 33 | III | Doubles (with Rowland Phillips) | Bolivia | Alejandro Mendoza / Rodrigo Banzer | 4-6, 6-7 |
▲2-1; 17 June 2019; Costa Rica Country Club, Escazu, Costa Rica; Americas Round Robin; Hard surface
| Victory | 34 | III | Doubles (with Rowland Phillips) | Panama | Jorge Daniel Chevez / Luis Gomez | 6-2, 6-1 |
▲2-1; 17 June 2019; Costa Rica Country Club, Escazu, Costa Rica; Americas Round Robin; Hard surface
| Victory | 35 | III | Doubles (with Rowland Phillips) | Trinidad and Tobago | Akiel Duke / Nabeel Majeed Mohammed | 6-3, 7-6 |
▲2-1; 17 June 2019; Costa Rica Country Club, Escazu, Costa Rica; Americas Round Robin; Hard surface
| Victory | 35 | III | Doubles (with Rowland Phillips) | Bermuda | Gavin Manders / Neal Towlson | 6-1, 6-3 |
▲2-1; 17 June 2019; Costa Rica Country Club, Escazu, Costa Rica; Americas Round Robin; Hard surface
| Defeat | 36 | III | Doubles (with Dimitri Bird) | Cuba | Yoan Perez / Osmel Rivera Granja | 6-4, 7-6 |
▲2-1; 17 June 2019; Costa Rica Country Club, Escazu, Costa Rica; Americas Round Robin; Hard surface
| Defeat | 37 | III | Doubles (with Dimitri Bird) | Honduras | Keny Turcios / Gabriel Zuniga Mendoza | 4-6, 6-1, 6-4 |

== Personal life ==
Pagon was born in Kingston, Jamaica and started playing tennis at six years old. He was given the opportunity at age 14 to attend Saddlebrook Academies, a tennis and golf academy in Tampa Florida. At the age of 17, Pagon was offered a scholarship to attend the College of William and Mary and graduated in 2009 with a degree in Economics. He is the son of Nigel Pagon and Shirley Wilson. Pagon has been married to his wife since 2021 and are expecting their first child together.

== Coaching career ==
The 2016-17 season was his second season as an assistant to head coach Jeff Kader at his alma mater The College of William and Mary.

In their first year, they guided W&M to a 15-9 record and its first Intercollegiate Tennis Association ranking in five years and climbed as high as No. 60 in the nation.
