= 2013 Davis Cup Americas Zone Group III =

International tennis competition

The Americas Zone is one of the three zones of regional Davis Cup competition in 2013.

In the Americas Zone in 2013 there are three different groups in which teams compete against each other to advance to the next group.

== Format ==
The teams were split into two groups, playing a round-robin, with the winner of each group playing the runner-up of the other group for promotion to Division II in 2014.

It was played in the week commencing 17 June 2012 at La Paz, Bolivia and was played on an outdoor clay court.

== Group A ==
		BOL	PAR	JAM	CUB
1	Bolivia (3–0)		3–0	3–0	3–0
2	Paraguay (2–1)	0–3		3–0	2–1
3	Jamaica (1–2)	0–3	0–3		2–1
4	Cuba (0–3)	0–3	1–2	1–2	

=== Paraguay vs. Cuba ===
Paraguay
2
Club de Tenis, La Paz, Bolivia
17 June 2013
Clay

Cuba
1

			1	2	3
1	(Paraguay) (Cuba)	Juan Carlos Ramírez; Randy Blanco	3; 6	6; 3	3; 6
2	(Paraguay) (Cuba)	Juan Borba; William Dorantes Sanchez	6; 3	7^{7} 6^{4}
3	(Paraguay) (Cuba)	José Benítez / Juan Carlos Ramírez; Randy Blanco / Roberto Cruz Ramos	6; 4	4; 6	7; 5

=== Jamaica vs. Bolivia ===
Jamaica
0
Club de Tenis, La Paz, Bolivia
17 June 2013
Clay

Bolivia
3

			1	2	3
1	(Jamaica) (Bolivia)	Brandon Burke; Federico Zeballos	2; 6	1; 6
2	(Jamaica) (Bolivia)	Dominic Pagon; Hugo Dellien	4; 6	1; 6
3	(Jamaica) (Bolivia)	Atton Burrell / Davian Burrell; Boris Arias / Hugo Dellien	1; 6	2; 6

=== Paraguay vs. Bolivia ===
Paraguay
0
Club de Tenis, La Paz, Bolivia
19 June 2013
Clay

Bolivia
3

			1	2	3
1	(Paraguay) (Bolivia)	Juan Carlos Ramírez; Federico Zeballos	3; 6	4; 6
2	(Paraguay) (Bolivia)	José Benítez; Hugo Dellien	6; 1	3; 6	1; 6
3	(Paraguay) (Bolivia)	José Benítez / Alex Gustavo Ruiz Díaz; Boris Arias / Carlos Taborga	3; 6	4; 6

=== Jamaica vs. Cuba ===
Jamaica
2
Club de Tenis, La Paz, Bolivia
19 June 2013
Clay

Cuba
1

			1	2	3
1	(Jamaica) (Cuba)	Brandon Burke; Randy Blanco	4; 6	6^{6} 7^{8}
2	(Jamaica) (Cuba)	Dominic Pagon; William Dorantes Sanchez	6; 1	6; 2
3	(Jamaica) (Cuba)	Brandon Burke / Dominic Pagon; Randy Blanco / Roberto Cruz Ramos	4; 6	6; 3	7^{7} 6^{4}

=== Paraguay vs. Jamaica ===
Paraguay
3
Club de Tenis, La Paz, Bolivia
21 June 2013
Clay

Jamaica
0

			1	2	3
1	(Paraguay) (Jamaica)	Juan Carlos Ramírez; Brandon Burke	6; 4	7^{7} 6^{5}
2	(Paraguay) (Jamaica)	Juan Borba; Dominic Pagon	6; 0	6; 4
3	(Paraguay) (Jamaica)	José Benítez / Juan Carlos Ramírez; Atton Burrell / Davian Burrell	7; 5	6; 2

=== Bolivia vs. Cuba ===
Bolivia
3
Club de Tenis, La Paz, Bolivia
21 June 2013
Clay

Cuba
0

			1	2	3
1	(Bolivia) (Cuba)	Federico Zeballos; Randy Blanco	6; 2	6; 3
2	(Bolivia) (Cuba)	Hugo Dellien; William Dorantes Sanchez	6; 1	6; 3
3	(Bolivia) (Cuba)	Boris Arias / Carlos Taborga; Randy Blanco / Roberto Cruz Ramos	6; 3	6; 4

== Group B ==
		BAH	CRC	HON	PAN	BER
1	Bahamas (4–0)		2–1	2–1	2–1	3–0
2	Costa Rica (2–2)	1–2		1–2	3–0	2–1
3	Honduras (2–2)	1–2	2–1		1–2	2–1
4	Panama (2–2)	1–2	0–3	2–1		2–1
5	Bermuda (0–4)	0–3	1–2	1–2	1–2	

=== Costa Rica vs. Bermuda ===
Costa Rica
2
Club de Tenis, La Paz, Bolivia
17 June 2013
Clay

Bermuda
1

			1	2	3
1	(Costa Rica) (Bermuda)	Pablo Núñez; Gavin Manders	6^{1} 7^{7}	6; 2	3; 6
2	(Costa Rica) (Bermuda)	Ignaci Roca; Jenson Bascome	6; 2	6; 4
3	(Costa Rica) (Bermuda)	Maurizio Feoli / Ignaci Roca; Jenson Bascome / Gavin Manders	6; 1	6; 3

=== Bahamas vs. Panama ===
Bahamas
2
Club de Tenis, La Paz, Bolivia
17 June 2013
Clay

Panama
1

			1	2	3
1	(The Bahamas) (Panama)	Devin Mullings; Luis Fernando García	6; 2	6; 0
2	(The Bahamas) (Panama)	Kevin Major; Walner Espinoza	3; 6	3; 6
3	(The Bahamas) (Panama)	Jamaal Adderley / Marvin Rolle; Walner Espinoza / John Silva	7^{7} 6^{4}	6; 4

=== Costa Rica vs. Honduras ===
Costa Rica
1
Club de Tenis, La Paz, Bolivia
18 June 2013
Clay

Honduras
2

			1	2	3
1	(Costa Rica) (Honduras)	Pablo Núñez; Ricardo Pineda	5; 7	6; 1	7^{8} 6^{6}
2	(Costa Rica) (Honduras)	Ignaci Roca; Keny Turcios	3; 6	3; 6
3	(Costa Rica) (Honduras)	Maurizio Feoli / Ignaci Roca; Keny Turcios / Ricardo Pineda	6^{4} 7^{7}	3; 6

=== Panama vs. Bermuda ===
Panama
2
Club de Tenis, La Paz, Bolivia
18 June 2013
Clay

Bermuda
1

			1	2	3
1	(Panama) (Bermuda)	Walner Espinoza; Gavin Manders	6^{5} 7^{7}	6; 4	6; 3
2	(Panama) (Bermuda)	José Gilbert Gómez; Na'im Azhar	6^{4} 7^{7}	6^{7} 7^{9}
3	(Panama) (Bermuda)	John Silva / Walner Espinoza; Jenson Bascome / Gavin Manders	6; 1	6^{6} 7^{8}	6; 1

=== Bahamas vs. Bermuda ===
Bahamas
3
Club de Tenis, La Paz, Bolivia
19 June 2013
Clay

Bermuda
0

			1	2	3
1	(The Bahamas) (Bermuda)	Devin Mullings; Gavin Manders	7; 5	6; 0
2	(The Bahamas) (Bermuda)	Kevin Major; Na'im Azhar	6; 4	6; 2
3	(The Bahamas) (Bermuda)	Jamaal Adderley / Marvin Rolle; Jenson Bascome / Philip Cooper	7^{7} 6^{2}	6; 3

=== Honduras vs. Panama ===
Honduras
1
Club de Tenis, La Paz, Bolivia
19 June 2013
Clay

Panama
2

			1	2	3
1	(Honduras) (Panama)	Ricardo Pineda; Luis Fernando García	3; 6	6; 1	6; 3
2	(Honduras) (Panama)	Alejandro Obando; Walner Espinoza	3; 6	7; 5	1; 6
3	(Honduras) (Panama)	Ricardo Pineda / Keny Turcios; Walner Espinoza / John Silva	6; 2	1; 6	4; 6

=== Costa Rica vs. Panama ===
Costa Rica
3
Club de Tenis, La Paz, Bolivia
20 June 2013
Clay

Panama
0

			1	2	3
1	(Costa Rica) (Panama)	Pablo Núñez; Walner Espinoza	6; 4	6; 2
2	(Costa Rica) (Panama)	Ignaci Roca; José Gilbert Gómez	6; 4	1; 6	6; 0
3	(Costa Rica) (Panama)	Maurizio Feoli / Alan Reifer; Walner Espinoza / John Silva	6; 3	6; 4

=== Bahamas vs. Honduras ===
Bahamas
2
Club de Tenis, La Paz, Bolivia
20 June 2013
Clay

Honduras
1

			1	2	3
1	(The Bahamas) (Honduras)	Devin Mullings; Alejandro Obando	6; 2	6; 1
2	(The Bahamas) (Honduras)	Kevin Major; Keny Turcios	3; 6	3; 6
3	(The Bahamas) (Honduras)	Jamaal Adderley / Devin Mullings; Ricardo Pineda / Keny Turcios	7; 5	6; 3

=== Costa Rica vs. Bahamas ===
Costa Rica
1
Club de Tenis, La Paz, Bolivia
21 June 2013
Clay

Bahamas
2

			1	2	3
1	(Costa Rica) (The Bahamas)	Maurizio Feoli; Jamaal Adderley	7^{7} 6^{5}	4; 6	4; 6
2	(Costa Rica) (The Bahamas)	Pablo Núñez; Kevin Major	6; 3	7; 5
3	(Costa Rica) (The Bahamas)	Maurizio Feoli / Alan Reifer; Jamaal Adderley / Marvin Rolle	2; 6	4; 6

=== Honduras vs. Bermuda ===
Honduras
2
Club de Tenis, La Paz, Bolivia
21 June 2013
Clay

Bermuda
1

			1	2	3
1	(Honduras) (Bermuda)	Alejandro Obando; Gavin Manders	6^{3} 7^{7}	7; 5	6^{4} 7^{7}
2	(Honduras) (Bermuda)	Keny Turcios; Jenson Bascome	6; 1	6; 2
3	(Honduras) (Bermuda)	Ricardo Pineda / Keny Turcios; Philip Cooper / Gavin Manders	7^{9} 6^{7}	6; 4

== Play-offs ==
=== Promotion ===
==== Bolivia vs. Costa Rica ====
Bolivia
2
Club de Tenis, La Paz, Bolivia
22 June 2013
Clay

Costa Rica
0

			1	2	3
1	(Bolivia) (Costa Rica)	Federico Zeballos; Maurizio Feoli	6; 1	6; 1
2	(Bolivia) (Costa Rica)	Hugo Dellien; Alan Reifer	6; 4	6; 3
3	(Bolivia) (Costa Rica)	Boris Arias / Carlos Taborga; Maurizio Feoli / Alan Reifer				not played

==== Paraguay vs. Bahamas ====
Paraguay
2
Club de Tenis, La Paz, Bolivia
22 June 2013
Clay

Bahamas
0

			1	2	3
1	(Paraguay) (The Bahamas)	Juan Carlos Ramírez; Marvin Rolle	4; 6	6; 4	6; 4
2	(Paraguay) (The Bahamas)	Juan Borba; Devin Mullings	4; 6	6; 4	6; 3
3	(Paraguay) (The Bahamas)	José Benítez / Juan Carlos Ramírez; Jamaal Adderley / Marvin Rolle				not played

=== 5th place play-off: Jamaica vs. Honduras ===
Jamaica
0
Club de Tenis, La Paz, Bolivia
22 June 2013
Clay

Honduras
3

			1	2	3
1	(Jamaica) (Honduras)	Atton Burrell; Ricardo Pineda	3; 6	6; 2	2; 6
2	(Jamaica) (Honduras)	Davian Burrell; Alejandro Obando	1; 6	2; 6
3	(Jamaica) (Honduras)	Atton Burrell / Davian Burrell; Alejandro Obando / Keny Turcios	6^{2} 7^{7}	6^{1} 7^{7}

=== 7th place play-off: Cuba vs. Panama ===
Cuba
2
Club de Tenis, La Paz, Bolivia
22 June 2013
Clay

Panama
1

			1	2	3
1	(Cuba) (Panama)	Randy Blanco; Luis Fernando García	6; 3	6; 4
2	(Cuba) (Panama)	William Dorantes Sanchez; Walner Espinoza	4; 6	4; 6
3	(Cuba) (Panama)	Randy Blanco / Roberto Cruz Ramos; José Gilbert Gómez / Walner Espinoza	6; 3	3; 6	6; 4

== Final standings ==
Rank	Team
1	Bolivia
2	Paraguay
3	Bahamas
4	Costa Rica
5	Honduras
6	Jamaica
7	Cuba
8	Panama
9	Bermuda

- Bolivia and Paraguay promoted to Group II in 2014.

== See also ==
- 2013 Davis Cup
- 2013 Davis Cup Americas Zone Group I
- 2013 Davis Cup Americas Zone Group II
