= 2010 Davis Cup Americas Zone Group III =

International tennis competition

The Americas Zone was one of the three zones of regional Davis Cup competition in 2010. It was divided into four groups. Teams in Group III competed for promotion to Group II for 2011, and to avoid demotion to Group IV.

The Group III tournament was held in the Week commencing July 7, 2010 in San Juan, Puerto Rico, on outdoor hard courts.

== Format ==
The eight teams were split into two groups and played in a round-robin format. The top two teams of each group advanced to the promotion pool, where the two top teams were promoted to the Americas Zone Group II in 2011. The last two placed teams of each group from the preliminary round were relegated into the relegation pool, where the two bottom teams were relegated to the Americas Zone Group IV in 2011.

== Group A ==
Team	Pld	W	L	MF	MA	Pts
Bahamas	2	2	0	6	0	2
Jamaica	2	1	1	2	4	1
Aruba	2	0	2	1	5	0
Cuba	-	-	-	-	-	-

=== Jamaica vs. Aruba ===
Jamaica
2
San Juan, Puerto Rico
7 July 2010
Hard

Aruba
1

			1	2	3
1	(Jamaica) (Aruba)	Dominic Pagon; Clifford Giel	6; 3	2; 6	4; 6
2	(Jamaica) (Aruba)	Damion Johnson; Gian Hodgson	6; 4	6; 4
3	(Jamaica) (Aruba)	Damion Johnson / Dominic Pagon; Clifford Giel / Gian Hodgson	4; 6	7; 5	7; 5

=== Bahamas vs. Aruba ===
Bahamas
3
San Juan, Puerto Rico
8 July 2010
Hard

Aruba
0

			1	2	3
1	(The Bahamas) (Aruba)	Devin Mullings; Ricardo Velasquez	6; 0	6; 0
2	(The Bahamas) (Aruba)	Marvin Rolle; Gian Hodgson	6; 2	6; 2
3	(The Bahamas) (Aruba)	Rodney Carey / Justin Lunn; Mitchell de Jong / Ricardo Velasquez	6; 2	6; 2

=== Bahamas vs. Jamaica ===
Bahamas
3
San Juan, Puerto Rico
9 July 2010
Hard

Jamaica
0

			1	2	3
1	(The Bahamas) (Jamaica)	Devin Mullings; Yussuf Migoko	6; 2	6; 1
2	(The Bahamas) (Jamaica)	Marvin Rolle; Damion Johnson	7^{7} 6^{1}	6; 3
3	(The Bahamas) (Jamaica)	Devin Mullings / Marvin Rolle; Dominic Pagon / Dwayne Pagon	6; 4	6; 1

== Group B ==
Team	Pld	W	L	MF	MA	Pts
Puerto Rico	3	3	0	8	1	3
Haiti	3	2	1	6	3	2
Costa Rica	3	1	2	3	6	1
Bermuda	3	0	3	1	8	0

=== Puerto Rico vs. Bermuda ===
Puerto Rico
3
San Juan, Puerto Rico
7 July 2010
Hard

Bermuda
0

			1	2	3
1	(Puerto Rico) (Bermuda)	Eduardo Pavia Suárez; Gavin Manders	6; 1	6; 2
2	(Puerto Rico) (Bermuda)	Alex Llompart; Na'im Azhar	6; 3	6; 0
3	(Puerto Rico) (Bermuda)	Ricardo González-Díaz / José Perdomo; David Thomas / Neal Towlson	6; 3	6; 3

=== Costa Rica vs. Haiti ===
Costa Rica
1
San Juan, Puerto Rico
7 July 2010
Hard

Haiti
2

			1	2	3
1	(Costa Rica) (Haiti)	Ignaci Roca; Joel Allen	7; 5	6; 3
2	(Costa Rica) (Haiti)	Pablo Núñez; Olivier Sajous	4; 6	4; 6
3	(Costa Rica) (Haiti)	Fernando Martínez Manrique / Ignaci Roca; Joel Allen / Olivier Sajous	2; 6	1; 6

=== Puerto Rico vs. Haiti ===
Puerto Rico
2
San Juan, Puerto Rico
8 July 2010
Hard

Haiti
1

			1	2	3
1	(Puerto Rico) (Haiti)	Ricardo González-Díaz; Jean Marc Bazanne	6; 4	6; 1
2	(Puerto Rico) (Haiti)	Alex Llompart; Olivier Sajous	6; 2	6; 4
3	(Puerto Rico) (Haiti)	Eduardo Pavia Suárez / José Perdomo; Joel Allen / Olivier Sajous	6^{1} 7^{7}	6^{2} 7^{7}

=== Costa Rica vs. Bermuda ===
Costa Rica
2
San Juan, Puerto Rico
8 July 2010
Hard

Bermuda
1

			1	2	3
1	(Costa Rica) (Bermuda)	Ignaci Roca; David Thomas	6; 0	6; 1
2	(Costa Rica) (Bermuda)	Pablo Núñez; Gavin Manders	4; 6	6; 2	4; 6
3	(Costa Rica) (Bermuda)	Fernando Martínez Manrique / Ignaci Roca; Na'im Azhar / Gavin Manders	6; 0	6; 2

=== Puerto Rico vs. Costa Rica ===
Puerto Rico
3
San Juan, Puerto Rico
9 July 2010
Hard

Costa Rica
0

			1	2	3
1	(Puerto Rico) (Costa Rica)	Eduardo Pavia Suárez; Fernando Martínez Manrique	7^{7} 6^{5}	7^{7} 6^{3}
2	(Puerto Rico) (Costa Rica)	Alex Llompart; Ignaci Roca	6; 1	6; 2
3	(Puerto Rico) (Costa Rica)	Ricardo González-Díaz / José Perdomo; Fernando Martínez Manrique / José-Carlos Hidalgo	6; 1	6; 3

=== Haiti vs. Bermuda ===
Haiti
3
San Juan, Puerto Rico
9 July 2010
Hard

Bermuda
0

			1	2	3
1	(Haiti) (Bermuda)	Jean Marc Bazanne; Neal Towlson	2; 6	6; 4	6; 2
2	(Haiti) (Bermuda)	Olivier Sajous; Na'im Azhar	6; 1	6; 1
3	(Haiti) (Bermuda)	Joel Allen / Jean Marc Bazanne; Na'im Azhar / David Thomas	6; 2	6; 2

== Promotion pool ==
The top two teams from each of Group A and B advanced to the Promotion pool. Results and points from games against the opponent from the preliminary round were carried forward.

Team	Pld	W	L	MF	MA	Pts
Puerto Rico	3	3	0	8	1	3
Haiti	3	2	1	7	2	2
Bahamas	3	1	2	3	6	1
Jamaica	3	0	3	0	9	0

Puerto Rico and Haiti promoted to Group II for 2011.

=== Puerto Rico vs. Jamaica ===
Puerto Rico
3
San Juan, Puerto Rico
10 July 2010
Hard

Jamaica
0

			1	2	3
1	(Puerto Rico) (Jamaica)	Ricardo González-Díaz; Dominic Pagon	6; 1	6; 2
2	(Puerto Rico) (Jamaica)	Alex Llompart; Damion Johnson	6; 2	6; 2
3	(Puerto Rico) (Jamaica)	Alex Llompart / José Perdomo; Damion Johnson / Dominic Pagon	6; 0	6; 4

=== Bahamas vs. Haiti ===
Bahamas
0
San Juan, Puerto Rico
10 July 2010
Hard

Haiti
3

			1	2	3
1	(The Bahamas) (Haiti)	Devin Mullings; Joel Allen	3; 6	6^{6} 7^{8}
2	(The Bahamas) (Haiti)	Marvin Rolle; Olivier Sajous	3; 6	6^{9} 7^{11}
3	(The Bahamas) (Haiti)	Devin Mullings / Marvin Rolle; Joel Allen / Olivier Sajous	6; 2	4; 6	5; 7

=== Puerto Rico vs. Bahamas ===
Puerto Rico
3
San Juan, Puerto Rico
11 July 2010
Hard

Bahamas
0

			1	2	3
1	(Puerto Rico) (The Bahamas)	Ricardo González-Díaz; Devin Mullings	4; 6	6; 1	7^{7} 6^{5}
2	(Puerto Rico) (The Bahamas)	Alex Llompart; Marvin Rolle	6; 2	6; 1
3	(Puerto Rico) (The Bahamas)	Eduardo Pavia Suárez / José Perdomo; Rodney Carey / Justin Lunn	6; 4	6; 2

=== Haiti vs. Jamaica ===
Haiti
3
San Juan, Puerto Rico
11 July 2010
Hard

Jamaica
0

			1	2	3
1	(Haiti) (Jamaica)	Jean Marc Bazanne; Dwayne Pagon	6; 2	6; 3
2	(Haiti) (Jamaica)	Olivier Sajous; Damion Johnson	6; 1	6; 2
3	(Haiti) (Jamaica)	Jean Marc Bazanne / Nicolas Etienne; Yussuf Migoko / Dwayne Pagon	2; 6	7; 5	6; 3

== Relegation pool ==
The bottom team from Group A and the bottom two from Group B were placed in the relegation group. Results and points from games against the opponent from the preliminary round were carried forward.

Team	Pld	W	L	MF	MA	Pts
Costa Rica	2	2	0	4	2	2
Aruba	2	1	1	3	3	1
Bermuda	2	0	2	2	4	0

Bermuda demoted to Group IV.

=== Bermuda vs. Aruba ===
Bermuda
1
San Juan, Puerto Rico
10 July 2010
Hard

Aruba
2

			1	2	3
1	(Bermuda) (Aruba)	Gavin Manders; Clifford Giel	6; 4	6; 2
2	(Bermuda) (Aruba)	Na'im Azhar; Gian Hodgson	1; 6	2; 6
3	(Bermuda) (Aruba)	Gavin Manders / Neal Towlson; Clifford Giel / Gian Hodgson	3; 6	3; 6

=== Costa Rica vs. Aruba ===
Costa Rica
2
San Juan, Puerto Rico
11 July 2010
Hard

Aruba
1

			1	2	3
1	(Costa Rica) (Aruba)	Fernando Martínez Manrique; Clifford Giel	4; 6	6; 0	2; 6
2	(Costa Rica) (Aruba)	Ignaci Roca; Gian Hodgson	6; 3	6; 1
3	(Costa Rica) (Aruba)	Fernando Martínez Manrique / Ignaci Roca; Clifford Giel / Gian Hodgson	6; 2	6; 3

== Final standings ==
Rank	Team
1	Puerto Rico
2	Haiti
3	Bahamas
4	Jamaica
5	Costa Rica
6	Aruba
7	Bermuda
8	Cuba (withdrew)

- Puerto Rico and Haiti promoted to Group II in 2011.
- Bermuda relegated to Group IV in 2011.
- Cuba withdrew from the Davis Cup.
