= Hugo Dellien =

Bolivian tennis player (born 1993)

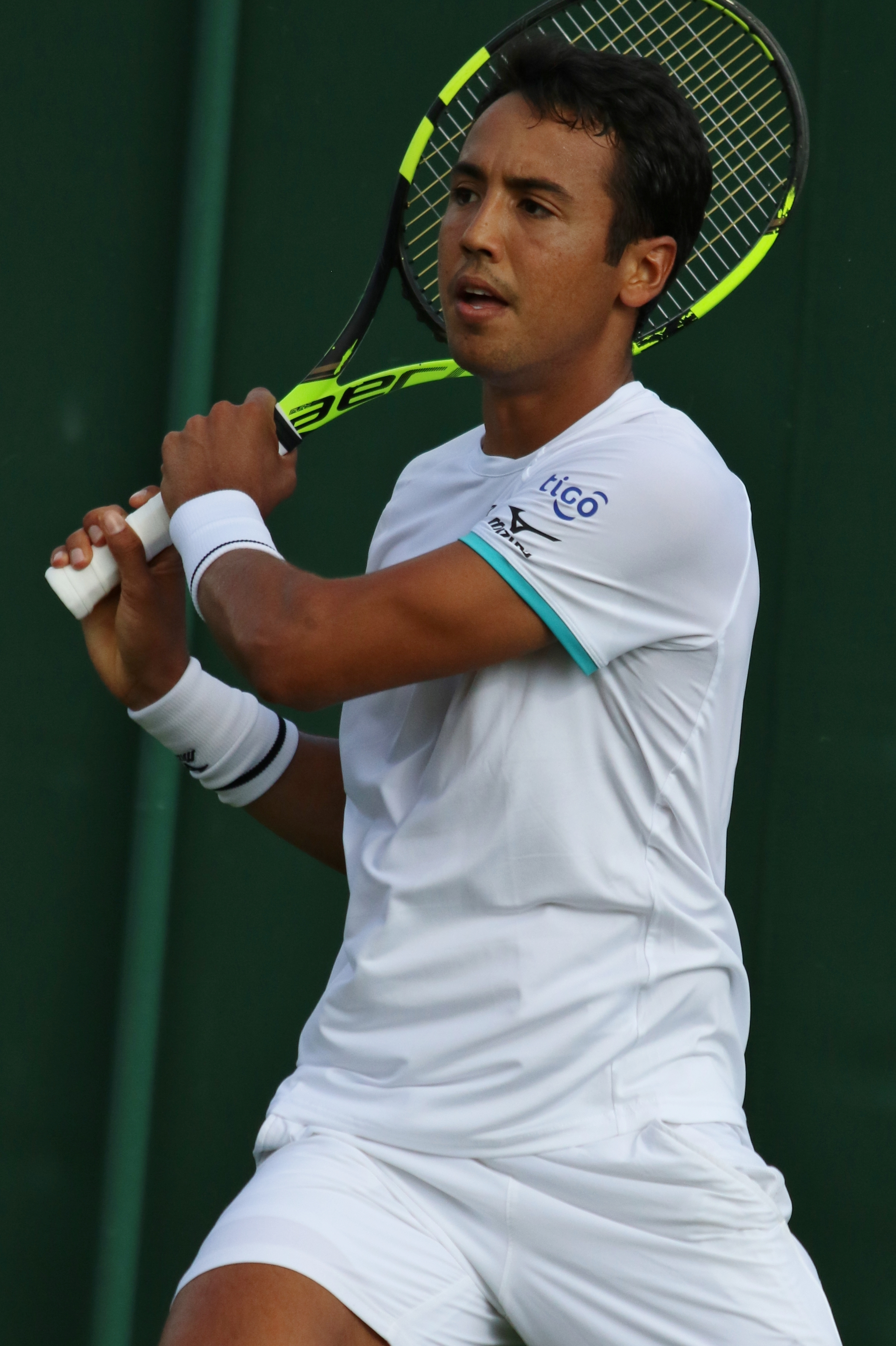
- Dellien at the 2019 Wimbledon Championships
- Full name: Hugo Dellien
- Country (sports): Bolivia
- Residence: Buenos Aires, Argentina
- Born: 16 June 1993 (age 33) Trinidad, Bolivia
- Height: 1.80 m (5 ft 11 in)
- Turned pro: 2009
- Plays: Right-handed (two-handed backhand)
- Coach: Antonio Pastorino, Andrés Schneiter
- Prize money: US $3,211,070

Singles
- Career record: 43–74
- Career titles: 0
- Highest ranking: No. 64 (1 August 2022)
- Current ranking: No. 140 (31 August 2026)

Grand Slam singles results
- Australian Open: 1R (2020, 2021, 2023)
- French Open: 2R (2019, 2022)
- Wimbledon: 1R (2019, 2022, 2023, 2025)
- US Open: 2R (2019)

Other tournaments
- Olympic Games: 1R (2020)

Doubles
- Career record: 10–24
- Career titles: 0
- Highest ranking: No. 185 (2 February 2015)

Grand Slam doubles results
- Australian Open: 1R (2020, 2023)
- French Open: 1R (2022, 2023)
- Wimbledon: 1R (2019, 2023)
- Last updated on: 31 August 2026.

Hugo Dellien Velasco (Spanish pronunciation: [ˈuɣo ðeˈljen]; (Note: In isolation, Dellien is pronounced [deˈljen].) born 16 June 1993) is a Bolivian professional tennis player. He has a career-high ATP singles ranking of No. 64, achieved on 1 August 2022, becoming the highest-ranked Bolivian since Mario Martínez (No. 60) in November 1983. He is the current No. 1 Bolivian tennis player. He also has a career-high ATP doubles ranking of No. 185 achieved on 2 February 2015. In juniors, Dellien had a career-high combined ranking of No. 2 in March 2011.

== Professional career ==
=== 2019–2022: ATP, Major debuts and first wins, Olympics and top 65 debuts ===
He made his ATP debut at the 2019 Córdoba Open as a lucky loser. At the 2019 Rio Open, Dellien defeated Carlos Berlocq in qualifying competition, Guido Andreozzi in the first round, and Roberto Carballés Baena in the second to reach the quarterfinals recording his first ATP main draw wins. Hugo became the first Bolivian player with an ATP win since Martínez at the French Open in 1984, trailing 3–1 in both sets before performing a comeback against Andreozzi to secure a historic achievement for both him and his country.

Ranked No. 128 at the 2021 Italian Open Dellien qualified for the main draw and recorded his second Masters win over world No. 36 Adrian Mannarino.

At the 2022 French Open he defeated Dominic Thiem to record his second Roland Garros win. He reached a new career-high ranking of No. 64 on 1 August 2022 following the 2022 Wimbledon Championships.

=== 2023: ATP semifinal, Struggling with form, out of top 150 ===
He entered the 2023 Australian Open using protected ranking having not competed on the ATP Tour since July 2022. At the 2023 Córdoba Open, Argentina he reached again the quarterfinals as a qualifier defeating two Argentines, fifth seed Pedro Cachin and Guido Pella. Next he defeated 2021 champion Argentine Juan Manuel Cerundolo in three sets to reach his first ATP semifinal in his career. He became the first Bolivian tour-level semifinalist since Martínez in Washington in 1983. At the same tournament partnering in doubles with Pella, he lost to Nicolás Barrientos/Ariel Behar in a close match. Next he entered the 2023 Argentina Open using protected ranking. At the 2023 Rio Open, also using a protected ranking, he reached the quarterfinals for a second time in four years at this tournament with a win over ninth seed Alex Molčan in the round of 16. As a result, he moved back into the top 100 at No. 96 on 27 February 2023.

In March, due to struggling with form, he dropped out of the top 100. In May 2023, he dropped further out of the top 150. He used protected ranking to enter the 2023 Italian Open and the 2023 Geneva Open. He also entered the main draw at the 2023 French Open and at the 2023 Wimbledon Championships using the same type of ranking.

=== 2024-2025: Three Challengers, back to top 100, Masters third round ===
He won his eleventh Challenger title and first of the season at the 2024 Iași Open in Romania, defeating Javier Barranco Cosano and becoming the first brothers with Murkel to win a Challenger title in the same season since the Cerúndolos in 2022.

He returned to the top 100 on 21 April 2025 at world No. 99. Ranked No. 103 at the Masters 1000, the 2025 Italian Open in Rome, Dellien replaced 26th seed Félix Auger-Aliassime directly into the second round, as a lucky loser, and defeated qualifier Thiago Seyboth Wild to reach a Masters third round for the first time in his career.

== National representation ==
Dellien qualified to represent Bolivia at the 2020 Summer Olympics.

Dellien has represented Bolivia at the Davis Cup with a W/L record of 26–10.

== Personal life ==
His younger brother Murkel Dellien is also a professional tennis player who formerly played at Wichita State University. Their father, Hugo Eduardo Dellien, represented Beni Department as a substitute member of the Chamber of Deputies for the Social Democratic Power alliance from 2006 to 2010.

Dellien owned an ice cream business alongside his father, Hugo Sr., purchased with some of his early career earnings.

Dellien is married to retired tennis player Liz Camila Giangreco Campiz; the couple share a daughter.

== Performance timelines ==
Key
W	F	SF	QF	#R	RR	Q#	P#	DNQ	A	Z#	PO	G	S	B	NMS	NTI	P	NH

(W) winner; (F) finalist; (SF) semifinalist; (QF) quarterfinalist; (#R) rounds 4, 3, 2, 1; (RR) round-robin stage; (Q#) qualification round; (P#) preliminary round; (DNQ) did not qualify; (A) absent; (Z#) Davis/Fed Cup Zonal Group (with number indication) or (PO) play-off; (G) gold, (S) silver or (B) bronze Olympic/Paralympic medal; (NMS) not a Masters tournament; (NTI) not a Tier I tournament; (P) postponed; (NH) not held; (SR) strike rate (events won / competed); (W–L) win–loss record.
To avoid confusion and double counting, these charts are updated at the conclusion of a tournament or when the player's participation has ended.

=== Singles ===
Tournament	2017 (Note: 2010- 2017)	2018	2019	2020	2021	2022	2023	2024	2025	2026	SR	W–L	Win %
Grand Slam tournaments
Australian Open		A	A	1R	1R	A	1R	Q2	Q3	Q1	0 / 3	0–3	0%
French Open		Q2	2R	1R	Q3	2R	1R	Q1	1R		0 / 5	2–5	29%
Wimbledon		Q1	1R	NH	Q2	1R	1R	Q2	1R		0 / 4	0–4	0%
US Open		Q1	2R	1R	Q2	A	1R	Q1	1R		0 / 4	1–4	20%
Win–loss		0–0	2–3	0–3	0–1	1–2	0–4	0–0	0–3	0–0	0 / 16	3–16	16%
National representation
Summer Olympics		NH			1R (Note: 2020 Summer Olympics is postponed to 2021 due to COVID-19 pandemic.)	NH			NH		0 / 1	0–1	0%
ATP Masters 1000
Indian Wells Masters		A	A	NH	A	A	A	A	A		0 / 0	0–0	–
Miami Open		A	Q1	NH	A	A	A	A	A		0 / 0	0–0	–
Monte Carlo Masters		A	A	NH	A	1R	A	A	A		0 / 1	0–1	0%
Madrid Open		A	2R	NH	A	1R	A	A	Q2		0 / 2	1-2	33%
Italian Open		A	A	Q2	2R	Q2	1R	A	3R		0 / 3	2–3	40%
Canadian Open		A	A	NH	A	A	A	A	1R		0 / 1	0–1	0%
Cincinnati Masters		A	A	A	A	A	A	A	1R		0 / 1	0–1	0%
Shanghai Masters		A	A	NH			A	A	A		0 / 0	0–0	–
Paris Masters		A	A	A	A	A	A	A	A		0 / 0	0–0	–
Win–loss	0–0	0–0	1–1	0–0	1–1	0–2	0–1	0–0	1–3	0–0	0 / 8	3–8	27%
Career statistics
	2017 (Note: 2010- 2017)	2018	2019	2020	2021	2022	2023	2024	2026|	SR	W–L	Win (%)	
Tournaments	0	0	16	7	5	10	12	3			Total: 53		
Overall win-loss	8–6	2–1	12–16	4–7	2–6	5–11	5–12	2–4		0 / 53	40–63	39%	
Win (%)	57%	67%	43%	36%	25%	31%	29%	33%		39%			
Year-End Ranking		122	75	111	119	117	112	124					

=== Doubles ===
Tournament	2018	2019	2020	2021	2022	SR	W–L	Win %
Australian Open	A	A	1R	A	A	0 / 1	0–1	0%
French Open	A	A	A	A	1R	0 / 1	0–1	0%
Wimbledon	Q1	1R	NH	A		0 / 1	0–1	0%
US Open	A	A	A	A		0 / 0	0–0	0%
Win–loss	0–0	0–1	0–1	0–0	0–1	0 / 3	0–3	0%

== ATP Challenger and ITF Tour finals ==
=== Singles: 49 (33 titles, 16 runner-ups) ===
Legend (singles) ATP Challenger Tour (17–11) ITF Futures Tour (16–5)	Titles by surface Hard (0–0) Clay (33–16)

Result	W–L	Date	Tournament	Tier	Surface	Opponent	Score
Loss	0–1	Sep 2012	Bolivia F2, Trinidad	Futures	Clay	(Argentina) Juan-Pablo Amado	2–6, 1–6
Win	1–1	Apr 2013	Chile F1, Santiago	Futures	Clay	(Chile) Gonzalo Lama	6–4, 6–7^{(6–8)}, 7–6^{(7–2)}
Win	2–1	Apr 2013	Argentina F3, Villa del Dique	Futures	Clay	(Argentina) Gabriel Alejandro Hidalgo	7–6^{(7–3)}, 2–6, 6–3
Win	3–1	Jul 2013	France F13, Saint-Gervais	Futures	Clay	(France) Johan Sébastien Tatlot	6–4, 5–7, 6–3
Loss	3–2	Sep 2013	Bolivia F3, Cochabamba	Futures	Clay	(United States) Chase Buchanan	2–6, 3–6
Win	4–2	Oct 2013	Bolivia F4, La Paz	Futures	Clay	(United States) Chase Buchanan	7–6^{(7–3)}, 2–6, 6–4
Win	5–2	Oct 2013	Bolivia F5, Santa Cruz	Futures	Clay	(Japan) Ryusei Makiguchi	6–1, 6–1
Loss	5–3	May 2014	Morocco F1, Safi	Futures	Clay	(Italy) Gianluigi Quinzi	2–6, 2–6
Win	6–3	Oct 2014	Bolivia F3, Santa Cruz	Futures	Clay	(Guatemala) Christopher Díaz Figueroa	6–3, 6–4
Loss	6–4	Nov 2014	Montevideo, Uruguay	Challenger	Clay	(Uruguay) Pablo Cuevas	2–6, 4–6
Loss	6–5	Dec 2014	Dominican R. F3, Santo Domingo	Futures	Clay	(Brazil) Fabiano de Paula	6–7^{(4–7)}, 2–6
Win	7–5	Aug 2015	Germany F10, Wetzlar	Futures	Clay	(Germany) Jan Choinski	6–3, 6–3
Win	8–5	Aug 2016	Austria F6, Vogau	Futures	Clay	(Italy) Omar Giacalone	6–4, 2–6, 6–2
Win	9–5	Jan 2017	USA F5, Weston	Futures	Clay	(Germany) Dominik Köpfer	6–2, 7–5
Loss	9–6	May 2017	Sweden F1, Karlskrona	Futures	Clay	(Germany) Jan Choinski	5–7, 6–4, 2–6
Win	10–6	May 2017	Sweden F2, Båstad	Futures	Clay	(Belgium) Yannick Vandenbulcke	6–4, 5–7, 6–2
Win	11–6	Jun 2017	Turkey F22, Istanbul	Futures	Clay	(Spain) Mario Vilella Martínez	6–2, 1–6, 6–2
Win	12–6	Jun 2017	Turkey F23, Istanbul	Futures	Clay	(France) Antoine Hoang	6–3, 6–2
Win	13–6	Aug 2017	Romania F9, Bucharest	Futures	Clay	(Romania) Dragoș Dima	6–2, 6–4
Win	14–6	Sep 2017	Bolivia F2, Cochabamba	Futures	Clay	(Colombia) Felipe Mantilla	6–4, 6–2
Win	15–6	Oct 2017	Bolivia F3, Santa Cruz	Futures	Clay	(Chile) Juan Carlos Sáez	6–4, 6–2
Win	16–6	Mar 2018	Italy F3, Santa Margherita di Pula	Futures	Clay	(Uruguay) Martín Cuevas	6–4, 7–6^{(7–3)}
Win	17–6	Apr 2018	Sarasota, USA	Challenger	Clay	(Argentina) Facundo Bagnis	2–6, 6–4, 6–2
Win	18–6	May 2018	Savannah, USA	Challenger	Clay	(United States) Christian Harrison	6–1, 1–6, 6–4
Win	19–6	Jun 2018	Vicenza, Italy	Challenger	Clay	(Italy) Matteo Donati	6–4, 5–7, 6–4
Loss	19–7	Jul 2018	Marburg, Germany	Challenger	Clay	(Argentina) Juan Ignacio Londero	6–3, 5–7, 4–6
Win	20–7	Mar 2019	Santiago, Chile	Challenger	Clay	(Chinese Taipei) Wu Tung-lin	5–7, 7–6^{(7–1)}, 6–1
Win	21–7	Jun 2019	Milan, Italy	Challenger	Clay	(Serbia) Danilo Petrović	7–5, 6–4
Loss	21–8	Nov 2019	Guayaquil, Ecuador	Challenger	Clay	(Brazil) Thiago Seyboth Wild	4–6, 0–6
Win	22–8	Oct 2021	Lima, Peru	Challenger	Clay	(Argentina) Camilo Ugo Carabelli	6–3, 7–5
Win	23–8	Nov 2021	Montevideo, Uruguay	Challenger	Clay	(Argentina) Juan Ignacio Londero	6–0, 6–1
Loss	23–9	Dec 2021	Florianópolis, Brazil	Challenger	Clay	(Brazil) Igor Marcondes	2–6, 4–6
Win	24–9	Mar 2022	Santiago, Chile	Challenger	Clay	(Chile) Alejandro Tabilo	6–3, 4–6, 6–4
Loss	24–10	Mar 2022	Concepción, Chile	Challenger	Clay	(Argentina) Tomás Martín Etcheverry	3–6, 2–6
Win	25–10	Mar 2023	Santiago, Chile	Challenger	Clay	(Brazil) Thiago Seyboth Wild	3–6, 6–3, 6–3
Loss	25–11	Aug 2023	Lüdenscheid, Germany	Challenger	Clay	(Croatia) Duje Ajdukovic	5–7, 4–6
Win	26–11	Oct 2023	Curitiba, Brazil	Challenger	Clay	(United Kingdom) Oliver Crawford	7–6^{(8–6)}, 4–6, 7–6^{(7–1)}
Win	27–11	Jul 2024	Iași, Romania	Challenger	Clay	(Spain) Javier Barranco Cosano	6–1, 6–1
Win	28–11	Aug 2024	Liberec, Czech Republic	Challenger	Clay	(Denmark) Elmer Møller	5–7, 6–4, 6–1
Win	29–11	Aug 2024	Bonn, Germany	Challenger	Clay	(Germany) Maximilian Marterer	7–6^{(7–2)}, 6–0
Loss	29–12	Nov 2024	Uruguay Open, Uruguay	Challenger	Clay	(United States) Tristan Boyer	2–6, 4–6
Loss	29–13	Feb 2025	Rosario, Argentina	Challenger	Clay	(Argentina) Camilo Ugo Carabelli	6–3, 3–6, 2–6
Win	30–13	Jun 2025	Prostějov, Czech Republic	Challenger	Clay	(Chinese Taipei) Tseng Chun-hsin	6–3, 6–4
Loss	30–14	Mar 2026	São Leopoldo, Brazil	Challenger	Clay	(Argentina) Facundo Díaz Acosta	7–5, 2–6, 4–6
Win	31–14	Apr 2026	Santa Cruz, Bolivia	Challenger	Clay	(Bolivia) Juan Carlos Prado Ángelo	6–4, 7–5
Win	32–14	Jul 2026	Trieste, Italy	Challenger	Clay	(Croatia) Matej Dodig	5–7, 6–4, 6–2
Loss	32–15	Aug 2026	Porto, Portugal	Challenger	Clay	(Argentina) Facundo Mena	6–7^{(4–7)}, 4–6
Loss	32–16	Oct 2026	Santa Cruz, Bolivia	Challenger	Clay	(Brazil) Thiago Seyboth Wild	4–6, 3–6
Win	33–16	Oct 2026	Guayaquil, Ecuador	Challenger	Clay	(Uruguay) Joaquín Aguilar Cardozo	7–5, 1–0 retired

=== Doubles: 38 (18 titles, 20 runner-ups) ===
Legend (doubles) ATP Challenger Tour (1–6) ITF Futures Tour (17–14)	Titles by surface Hard (0–1) Clay (18–19) Grass (0–0) Carpet (0–0)

Result	W–L	Date	Tournament	Tier	Surface	Partner	Opponents	Score
Loss	0–1	Sep 2010	Bolivia F2, La Paz	Futures	Clay	(Bolivia) Federico Zeballos	(Peru) Francisco Carbajal (Guatemala) Christopher Díaz Figueroa	2–6, 3–6
Win	1–1	Oct 2010	Bolivia F4, Santa Cruz	Futures	Clay	(Bolivia) Federico Zeballos	(Peru) Mauricio Echazú (Peru) Sergio Galdós	6–1, 6–4
Win	2–1	Sep 2011	Bolivia F1, La Paz	Futures	Clay	(Bolivia) Boris Arias	(Argentina) Juan Ignacio Londero (Argentina) Rodrigo Scattareggia	3–6, 7–6^{(7–3)}, [10–7]
Loss	2–2	Nov 2011	Chile F14, Villa Alemana	Futures	Clay	(Argentina) Juan Vázquez-Valenzuela	(Argentina) Juan-Pablo Amado (Argentina) Matías Salinas	6–7^{(1–7)}, 5–7
Loss	2–3	Mar 2012	Portugal F2, Faro	Futures	Hard	(Bolivia) Federico Zeballos	(Slovakia) Andrej Martin (Slovakia) Adrian Sikora	1–6, 2–6
Win	3–3	Aug 2012	Argentina F21, Rosario	Futures	Clay	(Japan) Ryusei Makiguchi	(Argentina) Guillermo Bujniewicz (Argentina) Fabricio Burdisso	6–4, 1–6, [10–7]
Win	4–3	Sep 2012	Argentina F22, Santiago del Estero	Futures	Clay	(Argentina) Mateo Nicolás Martínez	(Argentina) Federico Coria (Argentina) Valentin Florez	6–7^{(7–9)}, 6–1, [10–6]
Win	5–3	Sep 2012	Bolivia F1, Cochabamba	Futures	Clay	(Bolivia) Mauricio Doria-Medina	(Argentina) Juan-Pablo Amado (Japan) Ryusei Makiguchi	3–6, 6–3, [10–7]
Loss	5–4	Sep 2012	Bolivia F2, Trinidad	Futures	Clay	(Bolivia) Murkel Dellien	(Argentina) Facundo Mena (Colombia) Sebastián Serrano	3–6, 5–7
Loss	5–5	Oct 2012	Bolivia F5, Santa Cruz	Futures	Clay	(Bolivia) Mauricio Doria-Medina	(Peru) Mauricio Echazú (Peru) Sergio Galdós	3–6, 3–6
Loss	5–6	Mar 2013	Croatia F4, Poreč	Futures	Clay	(Chile) Felipe Ríos	(Italy) Alberto Brizzi (Italy) Daniele Giorgini	6–1, 5–7, [7–10]
Win	6–6	Jul 2013	France F13, Saint-Gervais	Futures	Clay	(Bolivia) Federico Zeballos	(France) Kevin Botti (France) Simon Cauvard	6–4, 2–6, [11–9]
Loss	6–7	Sep 2013	Bolivia F3, Cochabamba	Futures	Clay	(Bolivia) Murkel Dellien	(Argentina) Franco Feitt (Argentina) José Maria Páez	3–6, 3–6
Loss	6–8	Mar 2014	Salinas, Ecuador	Challenger	Clay	(Argentina) Eduardo Schwank	(Venezuela) Roberto Maytín (Brazil) Fernando Romboli	3–6, 4–6
Win	7–8	Mar 2014	Argentina F4, Marcos Juárez	Futures	Clay	(Argentina) Maximiliano Estévez	(Argentina) Juan Ignacio Londero (Argentina) Andrés Molteni	6–3, 6–4
Win	8–8	Mar 2014	Argentina F5, Rosario	Futures	Clay	(Argentina) Facundo Mena	(Brazil) Leonardo Kirche (Brazil) André Miele	6–4, 0–6, [10–5]
Loss	8–9	Mar 2014	Argentina F6, Olavarría	Futures	Clay	(Argentina) Maximiliano Estévez	(Argentina) Dante Gennaro (Japan) Ryusei Makiguchi	2–6, 3–6
Win	9–9	May 2014	Morocco F1, Safi	Futures	Clay	(Argentina) Leandro Portmann	(Morocco) Talal Ouahabi (Morocco) Taha Tifnouti	6–1, 7–6^{(14–12)}
Loss	9–10	Jul 2014	San Benedetto, Italy	Challenger	Clay	(Peru) Sergio Galdós	(Italy) Daniele Giorgini (Italy) Potito Starace	3–6, 7–6^{(7–3)}, [5–10]
Loss	9–11	Aug 2014	Ecuador F4, Quito	Futures	Clay	(Bolivia) Federico Zeballos	(Peru) Mauricio Echazú (Chile) Guillermo Rivera Aránguiz	3–6, 4–6
Loss	9–12	Oct 2014	Córdoba, Argentina	Challenger	Clay	(Argentina) Juan Ignacio Londero	(Brazil) Marcelo Demoliner (Chile) Nicolás Jarry	3–6, 5–7
Win	10–12	Dec 2014	Dominican R. F2, Santiago	Futures	Clay	(Peru) Duilio Beretta	(Brazil) Fabiano de Paula (Brazil) Thiago Monteiro	3–6, 6–4, [10–8]
Win	11–12	Dec 2014	Dominican R. F3, Santo Domingo	Futures	Clay	(Peru) Duilio Beretta	(Ecuador) Emilio Gómez (Mexico) Manuel Sánchez	6–7^{(9–11)}, 6–4, [10–4]
Loss	11–13	Jun 2016	Turkey F25, Marmaris	Futures	Clay	(Bolivia) Federico Zeballos	(Turkey) Tuna Altuna (Turkey) Cem İlkel	5–7, 3–6
Win	12–13	Aug 2016	Austria F6, Vogau	Futures	Clay	(Bolivia) Federico Zeballos	(Austria) Lenny Hampel (Austria) Sebastian Ofner	7–5, 6–4
Win	13–13	Aug 2016	Austria F7, Pörtschach	Futures	Clay	(Bolivia) Federico Zeballos	(Hungary) Péter Nagy (Slovenia) Nik Razboršek	6–3, 6–0
Loss	13–14	Nov 2016	Bolivia F1, La Paz	Futures	Clay	(Bolivia) Federico Zeballos	(Peru) Mauricio Echazú (Peru) Jorge Brian Panta	2–6, 6–7^{(3–7)}
Win	14–14	Nov 2016	Bolivia F3, Santa Cruz	Futures	Clay	(Bolivia) Federico Zeballos	(Argentina) Franco Emanuel Egea (Chile) Alejandro Tabilo	6–4, 6–4
Loss	14–15	May 2017	Turkey F20, Antalya	Futures	Clay	(Lithuania) Julius Tverijonas	(Spain) Sergio Martos Gornés (Spain) David Pérez Sanz	5–7, 4–6
Win	15–15	Jun 2017	Turkey F22, Istanbul	Futures	Clay	(Bolivia) Federico Zeballos	(Turkey) Sarp Ağabigün (Turkey) Altuğ Çelikbilek	6–4, 4–6, [10–3]
Loss	15–16	Jun 2017	Turkey F23, Istanbul	Futures	Clay	(Bolivia) Federico Zeballos	(Australia) Bradley Mousley (Spain) Mario Vilella Martínez	3–6, 3–6
Loss	15–17	Aug 2017	Romania F9, Bucharest	Futures	Clay	(Bolivia) Federico Zeballos	(Romania) Adrian Barbu (Romania) Florin Mergea	2–6, 6–4, [11–13]
Win	16–17	Sep 2017	Bolivia F2, Cochabamba	Futures	Clay	(Bolivia) Boris Arias	(Guatemala) Christopher Díaz Figueroa (Bolivia) Federico Zeballos	6–3, 6–3
Loss	16–18	Nov 2017	Guayaquil, Ecuador	Challenger	Clay	(Bolivia) Federico Zeballos	(El Salvador) Marcelo Arévalo (Mexico) Miguel Reyes-Varela	1–6, 7–6^{(9–7)}, [6–10]
Win	17–18	Mar 2018	Italy F3, Pula	Futures	Clay	(Uruguay) Martín Cuevas	(Italy) Gianluca Di Nicola (Italy) Walter Trusendi	7–6^{(7–3)}, 7–5
Win	18–18	Oct 2018	Campinas, Brazil	Challenger	Clay	(Argentina) Guillermo Durán	(Argentina) Franco Agamenone (Brazil) Fernando Romboli	7–5, 6–4
Loss	18–19	Sep 2019	Buenos Aires, Argentina	Challenger	Clay	(Bolivia) Federico Zeballos	(Argentina) Guido Andreozzi (Argentina) Guillermo Durán	7–6^{(7–3)}, 2–6, [1–10]
Loss	18–20	Mar 2024	Santa Cruz de la Sierra, Bolivia	Challenger	Clay	(Bolivia) Murkel Dellien	(Argentina) Andrea Collarini (Argentina) Renzo Olivo	4–6, 1–6

== Davis Cup ==
=== Participations: (26–10) ===
Group membership World Group (0–0) WG play-off (0–0) Group I (0–0) Group II (14–10) Group III (12–0) Group IV (0–0)	Matches by surface Hard (2–6) Clay (24–4) Grass (0–0) Carpet (0–0)	Matches by type Singles (18–7) Doubles (5–3)

- ▲ ▼ indicates the outcome of the Davis Cup match followed by the score, date, place of event, the zonal classification and its phase, and the court surface.

Rubber outcome	No.	Rubber	Match type (partner if any)	Opponent nation	Opponent player(s)	Score
▼1–4; 9–11 July 2010; Javier Luizaga, Cochabamba, Bolivia; Americas relegation play-off; clay surface
Victory	1	V	Singles	El Salvador	Sebastián Moreno	6–1, 7–5
▲3–0; 17 June 2011; Club de Tenis Santa Cruz, Santa Cruz, Bolivia; Americas round robin; clay surface
Victory	2	III	Doubles (with Boris Arias)	Aruba	Mitchell de Jong / Gian Hodgson	6–2, 6–3
▲2–1; 18 June 2011; Club de Tenis Santa Cruz, Santa Cruz, Bolivia; Americas promotion pool; clay surface
Victory	3	I	Singles	Guatemala	Julen Urigüen	6–4, 6–7^{(3–7)}, 6–3
▲3–0; 19 June 2011; Club de Tenis Santa Cruz, Santa Cruz, Bolivia; Americas promotion pool; clay surface
Victory	4	I	Singles	Costa Rica	Pablo Núñez	6–1, 6–1
▼1–4; 10–12 February 2012; Federación Dominicana de Tenis, Santo Domingo, Dominican Republic; Americas first round; hard surface
Defeat	5	I	Singles	Dominican Republic	Víctor Estrella Burgos	0–6, 2–6, 7–6^{(7–5)}, 0–6
Defeat	6	III	Doubles (with Mauricio Doria-Medina)	Dominican Republic	Víctor Estrella Burgos / José Hernández-Fernández	6–3, 2–6, 5–7, 3–6
▼1–3; 6–8 April 2012; Palmas Del Mar Tennis Club, Humacao, Puerto Rico; Americas relegation play-off; hard surface
Victory	7	II	Singles	Puerto Rico	Ricardo González-Díaz	6–2, 6–2, 3–6, 7–6^{(7–1)}
Defeat	8	IV	Singles	Puerto Rico	Alex Llompart	3–6, 5–7, 6–4, 0–6
▲3–0; 17 June 2013; Club de Tenis La Paz, La Paz, Bolivia; Americas round robin; clay surface
Victory	9	II	Singles	Jamaica	Dominic Pagon	6–4, 6–1
Victory	10	III	Doubles (with Boris Arias)	Jamaica	Atton Burrell / Davian Burrell	6–1, 6–2
▲3–0; 19 June 2013; Club de Tenis La Paz, La Paz, Bolivia; Americas round robin; clay surface
Victory	11	II	Singles	Paraguay	José Benítez	1–6, 6–3, 6–1
▲3–0; 21 June 2013; Club de Tenis La Paz, La Paz, Bolivia; Americas round robin; clay surface
Victory	12	II	Singles	Cuba	William Dorantes Sanchez	6–1, 6–3
▲2–0; 22 June 2013; Club de Tenis La Paz, La Paz, Bolivia; Americas Promotion Play off; clay surface
Victory	13	II	Singles	Costa Rica	Alan Reifer	6–4, 6–3
▼2–3; 31 January – 2 February 2014; Club de Tenis Trinidad, Trinidad, Bolivia; Americas first round; clay surface
Victory	14	II	Singles	Peru	Sergio Galdós	6–3, 6–4, 2–6, 6–4
Victory	15	III	Doubles (with Federico Zeballos)	Peru	Duilio Beretta / Sergio Galdós	7–6^{(7–4)}, 7–5, 6–4
Defeat	16	IV	Singles	Peru	Mauricio Echazú	6–7^{(4–7)}, 2–6, 2–6
▲3–1; 4-6 April 2014; Country Club Cochabamba, Cochabamba, Bolivia; Americas relegation play-off; clay surface
Victory	17	II	Singles	Guatemala	Andrés Bucaro	6–2, 6–3, 7–5
Victory	18	III	Doubles (with Federico Zeballos)	Guatemala	Andrés Bucaro / Christopher Díaz Figueroa	7–6^{(7–3)}, 7–5, 6–4
Victory	19	IV	Singles	Guatemala	Christopher Díaz Figueroa	6–3, 3–6, 6–2, 4–6, 6–2
▼1–3; 6-8 March 2015; Cancha Estadio Lorenzo Molina Casares, Mérida, Mexico; Americas first round; hard surface
Victory	20	II	Singles	Mexico	Tigre Hank	7–6^{(7–2)}, 2–6, 6–4, 6–1
Defeat	21	IV	Singles	Mexico	Daniel Garza	3–6, 2–6, 6–3, 3–6
▼2–3; 17-19 July 2015; Terrazas de Miraflores Tennis Club, Lima, Peru; Americas relegation play-off; clay surface
Victory	22	II	Singles	Peru	Juan Pablo Varillas	5–7, 6–4, 6–3, 7–6^{(7–3)}
Defeat	23	III	Doubles (with Federico Zeballos)	Peru	Duilio Beretta / Jorge Panta	7–6^{(7–5)}, 6–1, 4–6, 5–7, 4–6
Defeat	24	IV	Singles	Peru	Duilio Beretta	4–6, 2–6, 7–6^{(7–2)}, 6–0, 1–6
▲3–0; 11 July 2016; Club de Tenis La Paz, La Paz, Bolivia; Americas round robin; clay surface
Victory	25	II	Singles	Panama	Alejandro Javier Arrue Martiz	6–1, 6–0
▲3–0; 12 July 2016; Club de Tenis La Paz, La Paz, Bolivia; Americas round robin; clay surface
Victory	26	II	Singles	Cuba	William Dorantes Sanchez	6–2, 6–2
▲3–0; 14 July 2016; Club de Tenis La Paz, La Paz, Bolivia; Americas round robin; clay surface
Victory	27	II	Singles	Jamaica	Rowland Phillips	6–3, 6–2
▲2–0; 16 July 2016; Club de Tenis La Paz, La Paz, Bolivia; Americas Promotion Play off; clay surface
Victory	28	II	Singles	Costa Rica	Pablo Núñez	6–4, 6–4
▼2–3; 3-5 February 2017; Círculo Deportivo Internacional, San Salvador, El Salvador; Americas first round; hard surface
Defeat	29	II	Singles	El Salvador	Marcelo Arévalo	2–6, 4–6, 5–7
Defeat	30	III	Doubles (with Rodrigo Banzer)	El Salvador	Marcelo Arévalo / Rafael Arévalo	4–6, 7–6^{(7–5)}, 4–6, 2–6
▲4–1; 7-9 April 2017; Club de Tenis Santa Cruz, Santa Cruz, Bolivia; relegation play-off; clay surface
Victory	31	I	Singles	(The Bahamas) Bahamas	Spencer Newman	6–2, 6–0, 6–2
Victory	32	III	Doubles (with Federico Zeballos)	(The Bahamas) Bahamas	Philip Wilbert Major / Marvin Rolle	6–7^{(5–7)}, 6–1, 6–0, 6–1
▼1–4; 3-4 February 2018; Estadio "Isaac Gorostiaga" del tradicional Club de Tenis, La Paz, Bolivia; first round; clay surface
Defeat	33	I	Singles	Peru	Duilio Beretta	2–6, 2–6
▲5–0; 7-8 April 2018; Club de Tenis Trinidad, Trinidad, Bolivia; relegation play-off; clay surface
Victory	34	II	Singles	Puerto Rico	Juan Enrique Marrero	6–0, 6–1
Victory	35	III	Doubles (with Federico Zeballos)	Puerto Rico	Jorge Emanuel Ortiz García / Jorge Isaias Ortiz García	6–2, 6–4
Victory	36	IV	Singles	Puerto Rico	Guillermo Torres García	6–0, 6–0

== Record against top 10 players ==
As of 24 May 2022

Dellien's match record against those who have been ranked in the top 10 is as follows (former #1 in bold):

- (Latvia) Ernests Gulbis 1–0
- (France) Gilles Simon 1–0
- (Austria) Dominic Thiem 1–0
- (Serbia) Janko Tipsarević 1–0
- (Serbia) **Novak Djokovic 0–1**
- (France) Richard Gasquet 0–1
- (Russia) Karen Khachanov 0–1
- (Russia) **Daniil Medvedev 0–1**
- (Spain) **Rafael Nadal 0–1**
- (Japan) Kei Nishikori 0–1
- (United Kingdom) Cameron Norrie 0–1
- (Spain) Fernando Verdasco 0–1
- (Greece) Stefanos Tsitsipas 0–1
- (Poland) Hubert Hurkacz 0–2
- (Norway) Casper Ruud 0–2
- (Germany) Alexander Zverev 0–2
