= 2016 Davis Cup Americas Zone Group III =

International tennis competition

The Americas Zone was one of the three zones of the regional Davis Cup competition in 2016.

In the Americas Zone there were three different tiers, called groups, in which teams competed against each other to advance to the upper tier. Winners in Group III advanced to the Americas Zone Group II in 2017. All other teams remained in Group III.

== Participating nations ==
- Bahamas
- Bermuda
- Bolivia
- Costa Rica
- Cuba
- Honduras
- Jamaica
- Panama
- Trinidad and Tobago

=== Inactive nations ===
These nations decided not to compete in the 2016 Davis Cup.

- Antigua and Barbuda
- Aruba
- Eastern Caribbean
- Haiti
- Saint Lucia
- U.S. Virgin Islands

== Draw ==
Date: 11–16 July 2016

Location: Club de Tenis La Paz, La Paz, Bolivia (clay)

Format: Round-robin basis. Two pools of four and five teams, respectively (Pools A and B). The winner of each pool plays off against the runner-up of the other pool to determine which two nations are promoted to Americas Zone Group II in 2017.

Seeding: The seeding was based on the Davis Cup Rankings of 7 March 2016 (shown in parentheses below).

Pot 1	Pot 2	Pot 3	Pot 4
1. Bolivia (72); 2. Bahamas (78)	3. Honduras (85); 4. Jamaica (88)	5. Cuba (89); 6. Costa Rica (91)	7. Panama (102); 8. Bermuda (114); 9. Trinidad and Tobago (115)

Group A

	Bolivia	Jamaica	Cuba	Panama	RR W–L	Matches W–L	Sets W–L	Games W–L	Standings
Bolivia		3–0	3–0	3–0	3–0	9–0	18–0	109–35	1
Jamaica	0–3		3–0	3–0	2–1	6–3	12–7	93–59	2
Cuba	0–3	0–3		3–0	1–2	3–6	7–12	68–79	3
Panama	0–3	0–3	0–3		0–3	0–9	0–18	11–108	4

Group B

	Bahamas	Costa Rica	Honduras	Bermuda	Trinidad and Tobago	RR W–L	Matches W–L	Sets W–L	Games W–L	Standings
Bahamas		2–1	2–1	3–0	3–0	4–0	10–2	21–6	149–94	1
Costa Rica	1–2		2–1	2–1	3–0	3–1	8–4	19–11	164–133	2
Honduras	1–2	1–2		3–0	2–1	2–2	7–5	17–13	144–127	3
Bermuda	0–3	1–2	0–3		2–1	1–3	3–9	8–20	106–149	4
Trinidad and Tobago	0–3	0–3	1–2	1–2		0–4	2–10	6–21	87–147	5

== First round ==
=== Group A ===
==== Jamaica vs. Cuba ====
Jamaica
3
Club de Tenis La Paz, La Paz, Bolivia
11 July 2016
Clay

Cuba
0

			1	2	3
1	(Jamaica) (Cuba)	Damion Johnson; Yasier Estrada	6; 3	6; 3
2	(Jamaica) (Cuba)	Rowland Phillips; William Dorantes Sanchez	6; 1	6; 1
3	(Jamaica) (Cuba)	Dominic Pagon / Rowland Phillips; Osmel Rivera Granja / Cristian Rodriguez	2; 6	6; 3	6; 2

==== Bolivia vs. Panama ====
Bolivia
3
Club de Tenis La Paz, La Paz, Bolivia
11 July 2016
Clay

Panama
0

			1	2	3
1	(Bolivia) (Panama)	Federico Zeballos; Alejandro Benitez	6; 0	6; 0
2	(Bolivia) (Panama)	Hugo Dellien; Alejandro Javier Arrue Martiz	6; 1	6; 0
3	(Bolivia) (Panama)	Rodrigo Banzer / Alejandro Mendoza; Alejandro Javier Arrue Martiz / Alejandro Benitez	6; 1	6; 1

==== Jamaica vs. Panama ====
Jamaica
3
Club de Tenis La Paz, La Paz, Bolivia
13 July 2016
Clay

Panama
0

			1	2	3
1	(Jamaica) (Panama)	Damion Johnson; Alejandro Benitez	6; 0	6; 2
2	(Jamaica) (Panama)	Rowland Phillips; Alejandro Javier Arrue Martiz	6; 0	6; 0
3	(Jamaica) (Panama)	Dominic Pagon / Rowland Phillips; Alejandro Benitez / Brendan Cockburn	6; 0	6; 1

==== Bolivia vs. Cuba ====
Bolivia
3
Club de Tenis La Paz, La Paz, Bolivia
13 July 2016
Clay

Cuba
0

			1	2	3
1	(Bolivia) (Cuba)	Federico Zeballos; Osmel Rivera Granja	6; 2	6; 4
2	(Bolivia) (Cuba)	Hugo Dellien; William Dorantes Sanchez	6; 2	6; 2
3	(Bolivia) (Cuba)	Rodrigo Banzer / Alejandro Mendoza; Yasier Estrada / Osmel Rivera Granja	6; 2	6; 1

==== Cuba vs. Panama ====
Cuba
3
Club de Tenis La Paz, La Paz, Bolivia
15 July 2016
Clay

Panama
0

			1	2	3
1	(Cuba) (Panama)	Osmel Rivera Granja; Alejandro Benitez	6; 0	6; 1
2	(Cuba) (Panama)	William Dorantes Sanchez; Alejandro Javier Arrue Martiz	6; 2	6; 0
3	(Cuba) (Panama)	Yasier Estrada / Osmel Rivera Granja; Alejandro Benitez / Daniel Malca	6; 1	6; 1

==== Bolivia vs. Jamaica ====
Bolivia
3
Club de Tenis La Paz, La Paz, Bolivia
15 July 2016
Clay

Jamaica
0

			1	2	3
1	(Bolivia) (Jamaica)	Federico Zeballos; Damion Johnson	6; 4	6; 0
2	(Bolivia) (Jamaica)	Hugo Dellien; Rowland Phillips	6; 3	6; 2
3	(Bolivia) (Jamaica)	Rodrigo Banzer / Alejandro Mendoza; Dominic Pagon / Rowland Phillips	6; 4	7^{7} 6^{1}

=== Group B ===
==== Bahamas vs. Honduras ====
Bahamas
2
Club de Tenis La Paz, La Paz, Bolivia
11 July 2016
Clay

Honduras
1

			1	2	3
1	(The Bahamas) (Honduras)	Spencer Newman; Keny Turcios	2; 6	3; 6
2	(The Bahamas) (Honduras)	Baker Newman; Alejandro Obando	6; 2	6; 3
3	(The Bahamas) (Honduras)	Baker Newman / Marvin Rolle; Ricardo Pineda / Keny Turcios	6; 3	6; 0

==== Costa Rica vs. Trinidad and Tobago ====
Costa Rica
3
Club de Tenis La Paz, La Paz, Bolivia
11 July 2016
Clay

Trinidad and Tobago
0

			1	2	3
1	(Costa Rica) (Trinidad and Tobago)	Ignaci Roca; Luke De Caires	7^{8} 6^{6}	6; 3
2	(Costa Rica) (Trinidad and Tobago)	Pablo Nunez; Brandon Tom	6; 1	6; 3
3	(Costa Rica) (Trinidad and Tobago)	Pablo Nunez / Alvaro Daniel Riveros; Akiel Duke / Brandon Tom	6; 2	6; 2

==== Honduras vs. Bermuda ====
Honduras
3
Club de Tenis La Paz, La Paz, Bolivia
12 July 2016
Clay

Bermuda
0

			1	2	3
1	(Honduras) (Bermuda)	Keny Turcios; Gavin Manders	5; 7	6; 2	6; 3
2	(Honduras) (Bermuda)	Alejandro Obando; Neal Towlson	6; 2	3; 6	6; 2
3	(Honduras) (Bermuda)	Ricardo Pineda / Keny Turcios; Jenson Bascome / David Thomas	6; 3	6; 1

==== Bahamas vs. Costa Rica ====
Bahamas
2
Club de Tenis La Paz, La Paz, Bolivia
12 July 2016
Clay

Costa Rica
1

			1	2	3
1	(The Bahamas) (Costa Rica)	Spencer Newman; Ignaci Roca	6; 4	6^{7} 7^{9}	4; 6
2	(The Bahamas) (Costa Rica)	Baker Newman; Pablo Nunez	6; 3	6; 4
3	(The Bahamas) (Costa Rica)	Baker Newman / Marvin Rolle; Pablo Nunez / Alvaro Daniel Riveros	5; 7	6; 4	6; 3

==== Honduras vs. Trinidad and Tobago ====
Honduras
2
Club de Tenis La Paz, La Paz, Bolivia
13 July 2016
Clay

Trinidad and Tobago
1

			1	2	3
1	(Honduras) (Trinidad and Tobago)	Keny Turcios; Richard Chung	6; 0	6; 2
2	(Honduras) (Trinidad and Tobago)	Ricardo Pineda; Luke De Caires	4; 6	7^{7} 6^{3}	4; 6
3	(Honduras) (Trinidad and Tobago)	Alejandro Obando / Keny Turcios; Richard Chung / Akiel Duke	6; 2	6; 1

==== Bahamas vs. Bermuda ====
Bahamas
3
Club de Tenis La Paz, La Paz, Bolivia
13 July 2016
Clay

Bermuda
0

			1	2	3
1	(The Bahamas) (Bermuda)	Spencer Newman; Gavin Manders	6; 4	6; 4
2	(The Bahamas) (Bermuda)	Baker Newman; Neal Towlson	6; 3	6; 2
3	(The Bahamas) (Bermuda)	Spencer Newman / Marvin Rolle; Jenson Bascome / David Thomas	6; 2	6; 3

==== Costa Rica vs. Bermuda ====
Costa Rica
2
Club de Tenis La Paz, La Paz, Bolivia
14 July 2016
Clay

Bermuda
1

			1	2	3
1	(Costa Rica) (Bermuda)	Ignaci Roca; Gavin Manders	6; 2	6; 2
2	(Costa Rica) (Bermuda)	Pablo Nunez; David Thomas	6; 3	6; 4
3	(Costa Rica) (Bermuda)	Sebastian Quiros / Alvaro Daniel Riveros; Jenson Bascome / Neal Towlson	3; 6	7^{7} 6^{3}	6^{4} 7^{7}

==== Bahamas vs. Trinidad and Tobago ====
Bahamas
3
Club de Tenis La Paz, La Paz, Bolivia
14 July 2016
Clay

Trinidad and Tobago
0

			1	2	3
1	(The Bahamas) (Trinidad and Tobago)	Kevin Major; Luke De Caires	6; 2	3; 6	6; 1
2	(The Bahamas) (Trinidad and Tobago)	Spencer Newman; Akiel Duke	6; 3	6; 1
3	(The Bahamas) (Trinidad and Tobago)	Spencer Newman / Marvin Rolle; Richard Chung / Luke De Caires	6; 2	6; 3

==== Honduras vs. Costa Rica ====
Honduras
1
Club de Tenis La Paz, La Paz, Bolivia
15 July 2016
Clay

Costa Rica
2

			1	2	3
1	(Honduras) (Costa Rica)	Keny Turcios; Ignaci Roca	7^{7} 6^{5}	1; 6	7; 5
2	(Honduras) (Costa Rica)	Alejandro Obando; Pablo Nunez	6; 4	4; 6	3; 6
3	(Honduras) (Costa Rica)	Alejandro Obando / Keny Turcios; Pablo Nunez / Alvaro Daniel Riveros	2; 6	6; 3	5; 7

==== Trinidad and Tobago vs. Bermuda ====
Trinidad and Tobago
1
Club de Tenis La Paz, La Paz, Bolivia
15 July 2016
Clay

Bermuda
2

			1	2	3
1	(Trinidad and Tobago) (Bermuda)	Luke De Caires; Gavin Manders	1; 6	0; 6
2	(Trinidad and Tobago) (Bermuda)	Akiel Duke; David Thomas	6; 4	6; 1
3	(Trinidad and Tobago) (Bermuda)	Richard Chung / Luke De Caires; Jenson Bascome / Gavin Manders	6; 2	6^{6} 7^{8}	4; 6

== Play-offs ==
Placing	A Team	Score	B Team
Promotional	Bolivia	2–0	Costa Rica
Promotional	Jamaica	0–2	Bahamas
5th–6th	Cuba	2–0	Honduras
7th–8th	Panama	0–3	Bermuda
9th	N/A	—	Trinidad and Tobago

=== Promotional ===
==== Bolivia vs. Costa Rica ====
Bolivia
2
Club de Tenis La Paz, La Paz, Bolivia
16 July 2016
Clay

Costa Rica
0

			1	2	3
1	(Bolivia) (Costa Rica)	Federico Zeballos; Ignaci Roca	6; 2	6; 2
2	(Bolivia) (Costa Rica)	Hugo Dellien; Pablo Nunez	6; 4	6; 4
3	(Bolivia) (Costa Rica)	Rodrigo Banzer / Alejandro Mendoza; Pablo Nunez / Alvaro Daniel Riveros				not played

==== Jamaica vs. Bahamas ====
Jamaica
0
Club de Tenis La Paz, La Paz, Bolivia
16 July 2016
Clay

Bahamas
2

			1	2	3
1	(Jamaica) (The Bahamas)	Damion Johnson; Spencer Newman	6; 3	1; 6	5; 7
2	(Jamaica) (The Bahamas)	Rowland Phillips (tennis); Baker Newman	1; 6	6; 4	5; 7
3	(Jamaica) (The Bahamas)	Dominic Pagon / Rowland Phillips; Spencer Newman / Marvin Rolle				not played

=== 5th−6th ===
==== Cuba vs. Honduras ====
Cuba
2
Club de Tenis La Paz, La Paz, Bolivia
16 July 2016
Clay

Honduras
0

			1	2	3
1	(Cuba) (Honduras)	Osmel Rivera Granja; Alejandro Obando	6; 3	6; 4
2	(Cuba) (Honduras)	William Dorantes Sanchez; Ricardo Pineda	6; 1	2; 0		retired
3	(Cuba) (Honduras)	Yasier Estrada / Osmel Rivera Granja; Alejandro Obando / Keny Turcios				not played

=== 7th−8th ===
==== Panama vs. Bermuda ====
Panama
0
Club de Tenis La Paz, La Paz, Bolivia
16 July 2016
Clay

Bermuda
3

			1	2	3
1	(Panama) (Bermuda)	Alejandro Javier Arrue Martiz; Gavin Manders	0; 6	2; 6
2	(Panama) (Bermuda)	Brendan Cockburn; Neal Towlson	1; 6	2; 6
3	(Panama) (Bermuda)	Alejandro Benitez / Brendan Cockburn; Jenson Bascome / Gavin Manders	1; 6	1; 6
