= 2012 Davis Cup Americas Zone Group II =

International tennis competition

The Americas Zone is one of the three zones of regional Davis Cup competition in 2012.

In the Americas Zone there are three different groups in which teams compete against each other to advance to the next group.

== Participating nations ==
Seeds:

1. Paraguay
2. Venezuela
3. Mexico
4. Dominican Republic

Remaining nations:

- El Salvador
- Puerto Rico
- Barbados
- Bolivia

== Draw ==
Play-offs
Ciudad Merliot, El Salvador (hard)
1	Paraguay	2
El Salvador	3
Humacao, Puerto Rico (hard)
Bolivia	1
Puerto Rico	3

First Round
Saint Michael, Barbados (hard)
1	Paraguay	2
Barbados	3
Mexico City, Mexico (clay)
3	Mexico	5
El Salvador	0
S. Domingo, Dominican Rep. (hard)
Bolivia	1
4	Dominican Republic	4
Caracas, Venezuela (hard)
Puerto Rico	0
2	Venezuela	5

Second Round
Mexico City, Mexico (clay)
Barbados	0
3	Mexico	5
Valencia, Venezuela (hard)
4	Dominican Republic	3
2	Venezuela	1

Third Round
Santiago de los Caballeros, Dominican Rep. (clay)
3	Mexico	2
4	Dominican Republic	3

- Paraguay and Bolivia relegated to Group III in 2013.
- Dominican Republic promoted to Group I in 2013.

== First round ==
=== Paraguay vs. Barbados ===
Paraguay
2
National Tennis Centre, Saint Michael, Barbados
10–12 February 2012
hard

Barbados
3

			1	2	3	4	5
1	(Paraguay) (Barbados)	Juan-Enrique Crosa; Darian King	3; 6	3; 6	4; 6
2	(Paraguay) (Barbados)	Daniel-Alejandro López; Haydn Lewis	4; 6	5; 7	4; 6
3	(Paraguay) (Barbados)	Juan-Enrique Crosa / Gustavo Ramírez; Darian King / Haydn Lewis	3; 6	4; 6	4; 6
4	(Paraguay) (Barbados)	Daniel-Alejandro López; Anthony Marshall	7^{7} 6^{3}	6; 3
5	(Paraguay) (Barbados)	José Benítez; Seannon Williams	6; 3	6; 1

=== Mexico vs. El Salvador ===
Mexico
5
Rafael El Pelon Osuna, Mexico City, Mexico
10–12 February 2012
clay

El Salvador
0

			1	2	3	4	5
1	(Mexico) (El Salvador)	Daniel Garza; Rafael Arévalo	6; 3	5; 7	6; 4	6; 3
2	(Mexico) (El Salvador)	César Ramírez; Marcelo Arévalo	6; 1	6; 3	6; 4
3	(Mexico) (El Salvador)	Santiago González / César Ramírez; Marcelo Arévalo / Rafael Arévalo	6; 4	6; 2	7; 5
4	(Mexico) (El Salvador)	Daniel Garza; Marcelo Arévalo	6; 4	2; 6	6; 3
5	(Mexico) (El Salvador)	Manuel Sánchez; Andrés Weisskopf	6; 1	6; 1

=== Bolivia vs. Dominican Republic ===
Bolivia
1
Federación Dominicana de Tenis, Santo Domingo, Dominican Republic
10–12 February 2012
hard

Dominican Republic
4

			1	2	3	4	5
1	(Bolivia) (Dominican Republic)	Hugo Dellien; Víctor Estrella	0; 6	2; 6	7^{7} 6^{5}	0; 6
2	(Bolivia) (Dominican Republic)	Federico Zeballos; José Hernández	6; 2	4; 6	6; 2	6; 4
3	(Bolivia) (Dominican Republic)	Hugo Dellien / Mauricio Doria-Medina; Víctor Estrella / José Hernández	6; 3	2; 6	5; 7	3; 6
4	(Bolivia) (Dominican Republic)	Federico Zeballos; Víctor Estrella	2; 6	2; 6	2; 6
5	(Bolivia) (Dominican Republic)	Carlos Taborga; Roberto Cid	4; 6	2; 6

=== Puerto Rico vs. Venezuela ===
Puerto Rico
0
Centro Nacional de Tenis, Caracas, Venezuela
10–12 February 2012
hard

Venezuela
5

			1	2	3	4	5
1	(Puerto Rico) (Venezuela)	Ricardo González-Díaz; Luis David Martínez	2; 6	3; 6	6; 4	1; 6
2	(Puerto Rico) (Venezuela)	Gabriel Flores Ruiz; Ricardo Rodríguez	1; 6	3; 6	3; 6
3	(Puerto Rico) (Venezuela)	Gilberto Álvarez / Ricardo González-Díaz; Luis David Martínez / Roberto Maytín	3; 6	6^{8} 7^{10}	6^{4} 7^{7}
4	(Puerto Rico) (Venezuela)	José Perdomo; Ricardo Rodríguez	3; 6	2; 6
5	(Puerto Rico) (Venezuela)	Gabriel Flores Ruiz; Enrique Olivares	2; 6	6^{8} 7^{10}

== Second round ==
=== Mexico vs. Barbados ===
Mexico
5
Rafael El Pelon Osuna, Mexico City, Mexico
6–8 April 2012
clay (outdoor)

Barbados
0

			1	2	3	4	5
1	(Mexico) (Barbados)	César Ramírez; Darian King	6; 2	6; 3	6; 1
2	(Mexico) (Barbados)	Miguel Gallardo-Vallés; Haydn Lewis	6; 0	7^{8} 6^{6}	6; 0
3	(Mexico) (Barbados)	Santiago González / César Ramírez; Darian King / Haydn Lewis	6; 0	7; 5	6; 3
4	(Mexico) (Barbados)	Daniel Garza; Seanon Williams	6; 1	6; 1
5	(Mexico) (Barbados)	César Ramírez; Anthony Marshall	6; 0	6; 4

=== Dominican Republic vs. Venezuela ===
Venezuela
1
Cancha Jose Ignacio Colell, Valencia, Venezuela
6–8 April 2012
hard (outdoor)

Dominican Republic
3

			1	2	3	4	5
1	(Venezuela) (Dominican Republic)	David Souto; Roberto Cid	6; 2	3; 6	6; 2	6; 2
2	(Venezuela) (Dominican Republic)	Luis David Martínez; Víctor Estrella	4; 6	4; 6	0; 6
3	(Venezuela) (Dominican Republic)	Roberto Maytín / Román Recarte; Henry Estrella / Víctor Estrella	4; 6	6; 2	4; 6	4; 6
4	(Venezuela) (Dominican Republic)	David Souto; Víctor Estrella	6; 3	4; 6	1; 6	2; 6
5	(Venezuela) (Dominican Republic)	Luis David Martínez; Roberto Cid						not played

== Play-offs ==
=== Paraguay vs. El Salvador ===
El Salvador
3
Federacion Salvadorena de Tenis, Ciudad Merliot, El Salvador
6–8 April 2012
hard (outdoor)

Paraguay
2

			1	2	3	4	5
1	(El Salvador) (Paraguay)	Rafael Arévalo; Diego Galeano	7^{8} 6^{6}	6; 4	6; 4
2	(El Salvador) (Paraguay)	Marcelo Arévalo; Juan Carlos Ramírez	6; 2	6; 3	6; 3
3	(El Salvador) (Paraguay)	Marcelo Arévalo / Rafael Arévalo; Diego Galeano / Juan Carlos Ramírez	6; 3	6; 4	6; 4
4	(El Salvador) (Paraguay)	Alberto Emmanuel Alvarado Larin; Diego Galeano	1; 6	1; 6
5	(El Salvador) (Paraguay)	Rafa Orantes; Juan Carlos Ramírez	0; 6	6^{4} 7^{7}

=== Bolivia vs. Puerto Rico ===
Bolivia
1
Palmas del Mar Tennis Club, Humacao, Puerto Rico
6–8 April 2012
hard (outdoor)

Puerto Rico
3

			1	2	3	4	5
1	(Bolivia) (Puerto Rico)	Mauricio Doria-Medina; Alex Llompart	3; 6	2; 6	4; 6
2	(Bolivia) (Puerto Rico)	Hugo Dellien; Ricardo González	6; 2	6; 2	3; 6	7^{7} 6^{1}
3	(Bolivia) (Puerto Rico)	Mauricio Doria-Medina / Federico Zeballos; Gilberto Álvarez / Alex Llompart	3; 6	6; 3	4; 6	3; 6
4	(Bolivia) (Puerto Rico)	Hugo Dellien; Alex Llompart	3; 6	5; 7	6; 4	0; 6
5	(Bolivia) (Puerto Rico)	Mauricio Doria-Medina; Ricardo González						not played

== Third round ==
=== Mexico vs. Dominican Republic ===
Dominican Republic
3
Centro Espanol Inc., Santiago de los Caballeros, Dominican Republic
14–16 September 2012
clay (outdoor)

Mexico
2

			1	2	3	4	5
1	(Dominican Republic) (Mexico)	Víctor Estrella; Daniel Garza	6; 4	6; 2	6; 2
2	(Dominican Republic) (Mexico)	José Hernández; César Ramírez	6; 2	6^{6} 7^{8}	7; 5	4; 6	6; 3
3	(Dominican Republic) (Mexico)	Henry Estrella / Víctor Estrella; Santiago González / Bruno Rodríguez	5; 7	3; 6	6^{1} 7^{7}
4	(Dominican Republic) (Mexico)	Víctor Estrella; César Ramírez	7^{7} 6^{4}	6; 3	6; 4
5	(Dominican Republic) (Mexico)	Roberto Cid; Bruno Rodríguez	1; 6	0; 6
