= 2008 Davis Cup Americas Zone Group III =

International tennis competition

The Group III tournament was held on July 16–20, in Country Club, Tegucigalpa, Honduras on outdoor hard courts.

== Format ==
Cuba withdrew from the tournament. They remained in Group III in 2009. The seven remaining teams were split into two groups and played in a round-robin format. The top two teams of each group advanced to the promotion pool, from which the two top teams were promoted to the Americas Zone Group II in 2009. The remaining teams in each group from the preliminary round were relegated into the relegation pool, from which the two bottom teams were relegated to the Americas Zone Group IV in 2009.

== Pool A ==
	Group A	BAR	JAM	HON
1	Barbados (2–0)		2–1	3–0
2	Jamaica (1–1)	1–2		3–0
3	Honduras (0–2)	0–3	0–3	

=== Barbados vs. Honduras ===
Barbados
3
Country Club, Tegucigalpa, Honduras
16 July 2008
Hard

Honduras
0

			1	2	3
1	(Barbados) (Honduras)	Anthony Marshall; Calton Álvarez	6; 4	6; 3
2	(Barbados) (Honduras)	Haydn Lewis; Keny Turcios	6; 3	6; 3
3	(Barbados) (Honduras)	Russell Moseley / Michael Date; Calton Álvarez / Keny Turcios	4; 6	7^{7} 6^{3}	6; 2

=== Jamaica vs. Honduras ===
Jamaica
3
Country Club, Tegucigalpa, Honduras
17 July 2008
Hard

Honduras
0

			1	2	3
1	(Jamaica) (Honduras)	Damar Johnson; Calton Álvarez	4; 6	6; 3	6; 4
2	(Jamaica) (Honduras)	Dominic Pagon; Keny Turcios	6; 0	7; 5
3	(Jamaica) (Honduras)	Damar Johnson / Damion Johnson; Francklin García / Alejandro Obando	6; 2	4; 6	7^{8} 6^{6}

=== Jamaica vs. Barbados ===
Jamaica
1
Country Club, Tegucigalpa, Honduras
18 July 2008
Hard

Barbados
2

			1	2	3
1	(Jamaica) (Barbados)	Damar Johnson; Anthony Marshall	3; 6	6^{3} 7^{7}
2	(Jamaica) (Barbados)	Dominic Pagon; Haydn Lewis	6^{10} 7^{12}	4; 6
3	(Jamaica) (Barbados)	Damar Johnson / Damion Johnson; Russell Moseley / Michael Date	6; 4	7; 5

== Pool B ==
	Group B	GUA	PUR	PAN	ARU
1	Guatemala (3–0)		3–0	3–0	3–0
2	Puerto Rico (2–1)	0–3		3–0	2–1
3	Panama (1–2)	0–3	0–3		3–0
4	Aruba (0–3)	0–3	1–2	0–3	

=== Puerto Rico vs. Aruba ===
Puerto Rico
2
Country Club, Tegucigalpa, Honduras
16 July 2008
Hard

Aruba
1

			1	2	3
1	(Puerto Rico) (Aruba)	Eduardo Pavia Suárez; Gian Hodgson	4; 6	6; 2	1; 6
2	(Puerto Rico) (Aruba)	Alex Llompart; Mitchell de Jong	6; 0	6; 0
3	(Puerto Rico) (Aruba)	Alex Llompart / Jose Emilio Sierra-Short; Gian Hodgson / Abetti Thiel	6; 2	6; 4

=== Guatemala vs. Panama ===
Guatemala
3
Country Club, Tegucigalpa, Honduras
16 July 2008
Hard

Panama
0

			1	2	3
1	(Guatemala) (Panama)	Sebastien Vidal; Chadd Valdes	6; 3	6; 4
2	(Guatemala) (Panama)	Cristian Paiz; Alberto González	6; 2	6; 3
3	(Guatemala) (Panama)	Manuel Chávez / Christian Saravia; Carlos Silva / John Silva	6; 2	5; 7	6; 3

=== Puerto Rico vs. Guatemala ===
Puerto Rico
0
Country Club, Tegucigalpa, Honduras
17 July 2008
Hard

Guatemala
3

			1	2	3
1	(Puerto Rico) (Guatemala)	José Perdomo; Sebastien Vidal	5; 7	3; 6
2	(Puerto Rico) (Guatemala)	Alex Llompart; Cristian Paiz	7; 5	6^{1} 7^{7}	4; 6
3	(Puerto Rico) (Guatemala)	Eduardo Pavia Suárez / Jose Emilio Sierra-Short; Manuel Chávez / Christian Saravia	3; 6	0; 6

=== Panama vs. Aruba ===
Panama
3
Country Club, Tegucigalpa, Honduras
17 July 2008
Hard

Aruba
0

			1	2	3
1	(Panama) (Aruba)	Chadd Valdes; Gian Hodgson	7^{10} 6^{8}	6; 3
2	(Panama) (Aruba)	Alberto González; Mitchell de Jong	6; 0	6; 1
3	(Panama) (Aruba)	Carlos Silva / John Silva; Gian Hodgson / Abetti Thiel	6; 4	6; 1

=== Puerto Rico vs. Panama ===
Puerto Rico
3
Country Club, Tegucigalpa, Honduras
18 July 2008
Hard

Panama
0

			1	2	3
1	(Puerto Rico) (Panama)	José Perdomo; Chadd Valdes	6; 2	3; 6	6; 4
2	(Puerto Rico) (Panama)	Alex Llompart; Alberto González	6; 1	6; 1
3	(Puerto Rico) (Panama)	Eduardo Pavia Suárez / Jose Emilio Sierra-Short; Carlos Silva / John Silva	6; 4	6; 2

=== Guatemala vs. Aruba ===
Guatemala
3
Country Club, Tegucigalpa, Honduras
18 July 2008
Hard

Aruba
0

			1	2	3
1	(Guatemala) (Aruba)	Christian Saravia; Abetti Thiel	6; 1	6; 2
2	(Guatemala) (Aruba)	Sebastien Vidal; Gian Hodgson	6; 3	7^{7} 6^{3}
3	(Guatemala) (Aruba)	Manuel Chávez / Cristian Paiz; Mitchell de Jong / Abetti Thiel	6; 1	6; 2

== Promotion pool ==
The top two teams from each of Pools A and B advanced to the Promotion pool. Results and points from games against the opponent from the preliminary round were carried forward.

(scores in italics carried over from Groups)

	1st–4th playoff	GUA	JAM	BAR	PUR
1	Guatemala (2–1)		1–2	2–1	3–0
2	Jamaica (2–1)	2–1		1–2	2–1
3	Barbados (1–2)	1–2	2–1		1–2
4	Puerto Rico (1–2)	0–3	1–2	2–1	

- Guatemala and Jamaica promoted to Group II in 2009.

=== Barbados vs. Puerto Rico ===
Barbados
1
Country Club, Tegucigalpa, Honduras
19 July 2008
Hard

Puerto Rico
2

			1	2	3
1	(Barbados) (Puerto Rico)	Anthony Marshall; José Perdomo	1; 6	4; 6
2	(Barbados) (Puerto Rico)	Haydn Lewis; Alex Llompart	6^{5} 7^{7}	2; 6
3	(Barbados) (Puerto Rico)	Haydn Lewis / Russell Moseley; Eduardo Pavia Suárez / Jose Emilio Sierra-Short	6; 3	3; 6	6; 3

=== Guatemala vs. Jamaica ===
Guatemala
1
Country Club, Tegucigalpa, Honduras
19 July 2008
Hard

Jamaica
2

			1	2	3
1	(Guatemala) (Jamaica)	Sebastien Vidal; Damar Johnson	6; 3	6; 3
2	(Guatemala) (Jamaica)	Cristian Paiz; Dominic Pagon	3; 6	6; 2	6^{2} 7^{7}
3	(Guatemala) (Jamaica)	Manuel Chávez / Christian Saravia; Damar Johnson / Damion Johnson	6; 2	2; 6	6^{6} 7^{8}

=== Barbados vs. Guatemala ===
Barbados
1
Country Club, Tegucigalpa, Honduras
20 July 2008
Hard

Guatemala
2

			1	2	3
1	(Barbados) (Guatemala)	Anthony Marshall; Sebastien Vidal	6; 2	3; 6	7^{7} 6^{5}
2	(Barbados) (Guatemala)	Haydn Lewis; Cristian Paiz	4; 6	2; 6
3	(Barbados) (Guatemala)	Haydn Lewis / Russell Moseley; Manuel Chávez / Cristian Paiz	7^{11} 6^{9}	5; 7	4; 6

=== Jamaica vs. Puerto Rico ===
Jamaica
2
Country Club, Tegucigalpa, Honduras
20 July 2008
Hard

Puerto Rico
1

			1	2	3
1	(Jamaica) (Puerto Rico)	Damar Johnson; José Perdomo	3; 6	7^{7} 6^{5}	6; 4
2	(Jamaica) (Puerto Rico)	Dominic Pagon; Alex Llompart	2; 6	2; 6
3	(Jamaica) (Puerto Rico)	Damar Johnson / Damion Johnson; Alex Llompart / Jose Emilio Sierra-Short	6; 3	7^{7} 6^{4}

== Relegation pool ==
The bottom two teams from Pools A and B were placed in the relegation group. Results and points from games against the opponent from the preliminary round were carried forward.

(scores in italics carried over from Groups)

	5th–7th playoff	HON	PAN	ARU
1	Honduras (2–0)		2–1	2–0
2	Panama (1–1)	1–2		3–0
3	Aruba (0–2)	0–2	0–3	

- Aruba and Panama relegated to Group IV in 2009.

=== Honduras vs. Panama ===
Honduras
2
Country Club, Tegucigalpa, Honduras
19 July 2008
Hard

Panama
1

			1	2	3
1	(Honduras) (Panama)	Calton Álvarez; John Silva	6; 1	6; 1
2	(Honduras) (Panama)	Keny Turcios; Alberto González	1; 6	3; 6
3	(Honduras) (Panama)	Calton Álvarez / Francklin García; Alberto González / Carlos Silva	7; 5	6; 3

=== Aruba vs. Honduras ===
Aruba
0
Country Club, Tegucigalpa, Honduras
20 July 2008
Hard

Honduras
2

			1	2	3
1	(Aruba) (Honduras)	Abetti Thiel; Calton Álvarez	2; 6	1; 6
2	(Aruba) (Honduras)	Gian Hodgson; Keny Turcios	4; 6	2; 6
3	(Aruba) (Honduras)

== Final standings ==
Rank	Team
1	Guatemala
2	Jamaica
3	Barbados
4	Puerto Rico
5	Honduras
6	Panama
7	Aruba

- Cuba withdrew from the tournament. They remained in Group III in 2009.
- Guatemala and Jamaica promoted to Group II in 2009.
- Panama and Aruba relegated to Group IV in 2009.
