= 2018 Davis Cup Americas Zone Group II =

International tennis competition

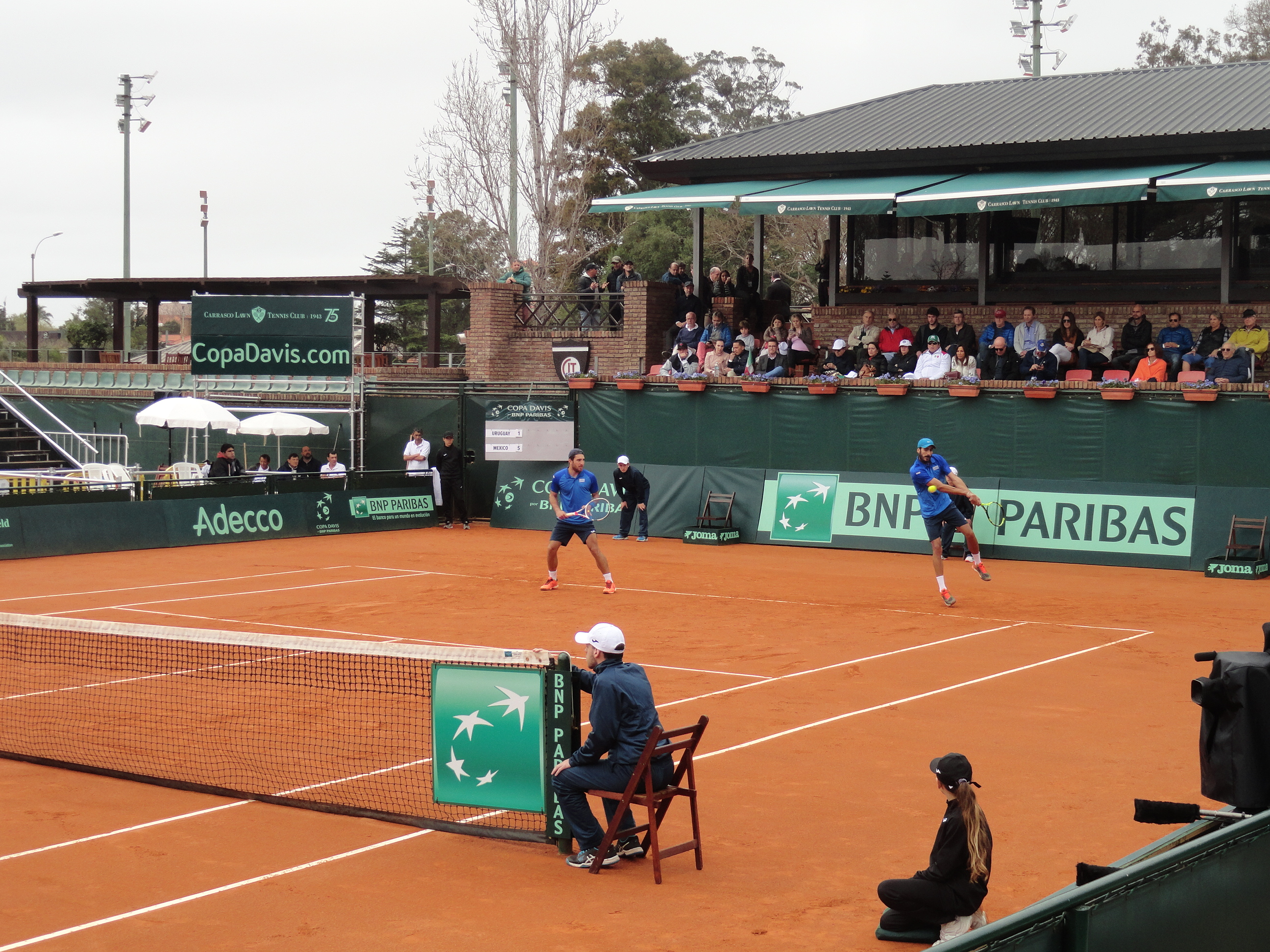
Doubles match at the final series of Group II between Uruguay and Mexico

The Americas Zone is one of the three zones of the regional Davis Cup competition in 2018.

In the Americas Zone there are three different tiers, called groups, in which teams compete against each other to advance to the upper tier. Winners in Group II advance to the Americas Zone Group I. Teams who lose their respective ties will compete in the relegation play-offs, with winning teams remaining in Group II, whereas teams who lose their play-offs will be relegated to the Americas Zone Group III in 2019.

== Participating nations ==
Seeds:

1. Venezuela
2. Peru
3. El Salvador
4. Mexico

Remaining nations:

- Bolivia
- Guatemala
- Puerto Rico
- Uruguay

=== Draw ===
Play-offs
Guatemala City, Guatemala (hard)
Guatemala	3
3	El Salvador	1
Trinidad, Bolivia (clay)
Puerto Rico	0
Bolivia	5

First Round
Guatemala City, Guatemala (hard)
1	Venezuela	3
Guatemala	1
San Salvador, El Salvador (hard)
3	El Salvador	1
Uruguay	4
Tijuana, Mexico (hard)
Puerto Rico	0
4	Mexico	5
La Paz, Bolivia (clay)
Bolivia	1
2	Peru	4

Second Round
Montevideo, Uruguay (clay)
1	Venezuela	1
Uruguay	4
Metepec, Mexico (hard)
4	Mexico	3
2	Peru	1

Third Round
Montevideo, Uruguay (clay)
Uruguay	3
4	Mexico	1

- El Salvador and Puerto Rico relegated to Group III in 2019.
- Uruguay promoted to Group I in 2019.

== First round ==
=== Guatemala vs. Venezuela ===
Guatemala
1
Federación Nacional de Tenis, Guatemala City, Guatemala
3–4 February
Hard

Venezuela
3

			1	2	3
1	(Guatemala) (Venezuela)	Wilfredo González; Ricardo Rodríguez	6^{4} 7^{7}	6^{4} 7^{7}
2	(Guatemala) (Venezuela)	Christopher Díaz Figueroa; Jordi Muñoz Abreu	6; 2	6; 3
3	(Guatemala) (Venezuela)	Christopher Díaz Figueroa / Wilfredo González; Luis David Martínez / Roberto Maytín	2; 6	6; 2	3; 6
4	(Guatemala) (Venezuela)	Christopher Díaz Figueroa; Ricardo Rodríguez	6; 4	3; 6	0; 6
5	(Guatemala) (Venezuela)	Wilfredo González; Jordi Muñoz Abreu				not played

=== El Salvador vs. Uruguay ===
El Salvador
1
Círculo Deportivo Internacional, San Salvador, El Salvador
3–4 February
Hard

Uruguay
4

			1	2	3
1	(El Salvador) (Uruguay)	Alberto Emmanuel Alvarado Larín; Pablo Cuevas	1; 6	3; 6
2	(El Salvador) (Uruguay)	Marcelo Arévalo; Martín Cuevas	6; 3	6^{4} 7^{7}	7^{7} 6^{5}
3	(El Salvador) (Uruguay)	Marcelo Arévalo / Rafael Arévalo; Martín Cuevas / Pablo Cuevas	6^{5} 7^{7}	6^{2} 7^{7}
4	(El Salvador) (Uruguay)	Marcelo Arévalo; Pablo Cuevas	4; 6	4; 6
5	(El Salvador) (Uruguay)	Rafael Eduardo González Retana; Rodrigo Arús	2; 6	1; 6

=== Mexico vs. Puerto Rico ===
Mexico
5
Cancha Central Club Campestre, Tijuana, Mexico
3–4 February
Hard

Puerto Rico
0

			1	2	3
1	(Mexico) (Puerto Rico)	Manuel Sánchez; Ignacio García	7^{7} 6^{5}	6; 4
2	(Mexico) (Puerto Rico)	Luis Patiño; Alex Díaz	6; 3	6; 4
3	(Mexico) (Puerto Rico)	Santiago González / Miguel Ángel Reyes-Varela; Sebastián Arcila / Alex Díaz	6; 4	6; 0
4	(Mexico) (Puerto Rico)	Manuel Sánchez; Sebastián Arcila	7; 5	6; 0
5	(Mexico) (Puerto Rico)	Luis Patiño; Ignacio García	7; 5	6; 2

=== Bolivia vs. Peru ===
Bolivia
1
Isaac Gorostiaga, La Paz, Bolivia
3–4 February
Clay

Peru
4

			1	2	3
1	(Bolivia) (Peru)	Hugo Dellien; Duilio Beretta	2; 6	2; 6
2	(Bolivia) (Peru)	Federico Zeballos; Juan Pablo Varillas	6^{8} 7^{10}	4; 6
3	(Bolivia) (Peru)	Boris Arias / Federico Zeballos; Duilio Beretta / Sergio Galdós	6^{4} 7^{7}	6^{6} 7^{8}
4	(Bolivia) (Peru)	Alejandro Mendoza; Jorge Panta	2; 6	4; 6
5	(Bolivia) (Peru)	Luis Chávez; Mauricio Echazú	6; 3	3; 6	10; 4

== Second round ==
=== Uruguay vs. Venezuela ===
Uruguay
4
Carrasco Lawn Tennis Club, Montevideo, Uruguay
7–8 April
Clay

Venezuela
1

			1	2	3
1	(Uruguay) (Venezuela)	Pablo Cuevas; David Souto	7; 5	6; 4
2	(Uruguay) (Venezuela)	Martín Cuevas; Ricardo Rodríguez	6; 4	4; 6	1; 6
3	(Uruguay) (Venezuela)	Martín Cuevas / Pablo Cuevas; Ricardo Rodríguez / David Souto	6; 3	6; 2
4	(Uruguay) (Venezuela)	Pablo Cuevas; Ricardo Rodríguez	6; 2	6; 1
5	(Uruguay) (Venezuela)	Francisco Llanes; Brandon Pérez	5; 7	6; 3	13; 11

=== Mexico vs. Peru ===
Mexico
3
Club Deportivo la Asunción, Metepec, Mexico
7–8 April
Hard

Peru
1

			1	2	3
1	(Mexico) (Peru)	Gerardo López Villaseñor; Juan Pablo Varillas	6; 4	7^{7} 6^{3}
2	(Mexico) (Peru)	Luis Patiño; Nicolás Álvarez	3; 6	6; 3	4; 6
3	(Mexico) (Peru)	Santiago González / Miguel Ángel Reyes-Varela; Duilio Beretta / Jorge Panta	7^{15} 6^{13}	7^{7} 6^{3}
4	(Mexico) (Peru)	Luis Patiño; Juan Pablo Varillas	7^{8} 6^{6}	3; 6	6; 3
5	(Mexico) (Peru)	Gerardo López Villaseñor; Nicolás Álvarez				not played

== Play-offs ==
=== Guatemala vs. El Salvador ===
Guatemala
3
Federación Nacional de Tenis, Guatemala City, Guatemala
7–8 April
Hard

El Salvador
1

			1	2	3
1	(Guatemala) (El Salvador)	Wilfredo González; Marcelo Arévalo	7; 5	6^{3} 7^{7}	2; 6
2	(Guatemala) (El Salvador)	Christopher Díaz Figueroa; Alberto Emmanuel Alvarado Larín	6; 3	6; 4
3	(Guatemala) (El Salvador)	Christopher Díaz Figueroa / Wilfredo González; Marcelo Arévalo / Rafael Arévalo	7^{7} 6^{4}	7; 5
4	(Guatemala) (El Salvador)	Christopher Díaz Figueroa; Rafael Arévalo	1; 6	0; 1		retired
5	(Guatemala) (El Salvador)	Wilfredo González; Alberto Emmanuel Alvarado Larín				not played

=== Bolivia vs. Puerto Rico ===
Bolivia
5
Club de Tenis Trinidad, Trinidad, Bolivia
7–8 April
Clay

Puerto Rico
0

			1	2	3
1	(Bolivia) (Puerto Rico)	Federico Zeballos; Jorge Emanuel Ortiz García	6; 1	6; 2
2	(Bolivia) (Puerto Rico)	Hugo Dellien; Juan Enrique Marrero	6; 0	6; 1
3	(Bolivia) (Puerto Rico)	Hugo Dellien / Federico Zeballos; Jorge Emanuel Ortiz García / Jorge Isaias Ortiz García	6; 2	6; 4
4	(Bolivia) (Puerto Rico)	Hugo Dellien; Guillermo Torres García	6; 0	6; 0
5	(Bolivia) (Puerto Rico)	Boris Arias; Juan Enrique Marrero	6; 3	6; 1

== Third round ==
=== Uruguay vs. Mexico ===
Uruguay
3
Carrasco Lawn Tennis Club, Montevideo, Uruguay
15–16 September
Clay

Mexico
1

			1	2	3
1	(Uruguay) (Mexico)	Pablo Cuevas; Luis Patiño	7; 5	6; 2
2	(Uruguay) (Mexico)	Martín Cuevas; Lucas Gómez	6; 4	6; 3
3	(Uruguay) (Mexico)	Rodrigo Arús / Nicolás Xiviller; Santiago González / Miguel Ángel Reyes-Varela	1; 6	1; 6
4	(Uruguay) (Mexico)	Pablo Cuevas; Gerardo López Villaseñor	1; 6	7^{7} 6^{5}	6; 3
5	(Uruguay) (Mexico)	Martín Cuevas; Luis Patiño				not played
