= Tennis at the 2010 Central American and Caribbean Games =

Event held in Mayagüez, Puerto Rico

- Venue: Mayagüez University Campus Tennis Courts
- Location: Mayagüez
- Dates: 26-31 July

The tennis competition at the 2010 Central American and Caribbean Games was held in Mayagüez, Puerto Rico.

The tournament was scheduled to be held from 26 to 31 July at the Mayagüez University Campus Tennis Courts in Mayagüez.

== Medal summary ==
=== Men's events ===
Event	Gold	Silver	Bronze
Singles	Víctor Estrella Burgos (DOM)	Daniel Garza (MEX)	Bruno Rodríguez (MEX)
Singles	Víctor Estrella Burgos (DOM)	Daniel Garza (MEX)	Marcelo Arévalo (ESA)
Doubles	José de Armas and Piero Luisi (VEN)	Luis Díaz Barriga and César Ramírez (MEX)	Alex Llompart and Jose Perdomo (PUR); Devin Mullings and Marvin Rolle (BAH)

=== Women's events ===
Event	Gold	Silver	Bronze
Singles	Monica Puig (PUR)	Adriana Pérez (VEN)	Larika Russell (BAH)
Singles	Monica Puig (PUR)	Adriana Pérez (VEN)	Alejandra Granillo (MEX)
Doubles	Nikkita Fountain and Larika Russell (BAH)	Daysi Espinal and Francesca Segarelli (DOM)	Melissa Golfin and Camila Quesada (CRC); Andrea Gámiz and Mariana Muci (VEN)

=== Mixed event ===
Event	Gold	Silver	Bronze
Doubles	Mexico (MEX); Daniel Garza; Melissa Torres Sandoval	Venezuela (VEN); José de Armas; Adriana Pérez	Puerto Rico (PUR); Alex Llompart; Monica Puig
Doubles	Mexico (MEX); Daniel Garza; Melissa Torres Sandoval	Venezuela (VEN); José de Armas; Adriana Pérez	Dominican Republic (DOM); José Hernández; Chandra Capozzi

=== Medal table ===
* Host nation (Puerto Rico)

Rank	Nation	Gold	Silver	Bronze	Total
1	Mexico (MEX)	1	2	2	5
2	Venezuela (VEN)	1	2	1	4
3	Dominican Republic (DOM)	1	1	1	3
4	Bahamas (BAH)	1	0	2	3
4	Puerto Rico (PUR)*	1	0	2	3
6	Costa Rica (CRC)	0	0	1	1
6	El Salvador (ESA)	0	0	1	1
Totals (7 entries)		5	5	10	20

== Men's singles ==
=== Seeds ===
1. (Dominican Republic) Víctor Estrella Burgos (Champion; gold medalist)
2. (Mexico) Daniel Garza (Final; silver medalist)
3. (Mexico) Bruno Rodríguez (Semifinals; bronze medalist)
4. (El Salvador) Marcelo Arévalo (Semifinals; bronze medalist)
5. (Guatemala) Christopher Díaz Figueroa (Quarterfinals)
6. (Venezuela) Román Recarte (Quarterfinals)
7. (Venezuela) Luis David Martínez (Quarterfinals)
8. (Haiti) Olivier Sajous (Quarterfinals)

=== Draw ===
==== Finals ====
Semifinals
1	(Dominican Republic) Víctor Estrella Burgos	7^{9}	7
3	(Mexico) Bruno Rodriguez	6^{7}	5
4	(El Salvador) Marcelo Arévalo	4	2
2	(Mexico) Daniel Garza	6	6

Gold medal match
1	(Dominican Republic) Víctor Estrella Burgos	7^{9}	6
2	(Mexico) Daniel Garza	6^{7}	1

==== Top half ====
First Round
(Costa Rica) P Nuñez	4	1
(Barbados) D King	6	6
(The Bahamas) M Rolle	6	6
(Bermuda) N Azhar	3	2
(Trinidad and Tobago) J Cadogan	1	5^{r}
5	(Guatemala) C Díaz Figueroa	6	5
3	(Mexico) B Rodríguez	6	6
(Puerto Rico) R Gonzalez	3	3
(El Salvador) R Arévalo	7	4	6
(Haiti) J Allen	5	6	2
(British Virgin Islands) D Fonseca	2	0
(United States Virgin Islands) N Bass	6	6
(Saint Vincent and the Grenadines) K da Silva	1	3
7	(Venezuela) LD Martínez	6	6

Second Round
1	(Dominican Republic) V Estrella Burgos	6	6
(Barbados) D King	3	4
(The Bahamas) M Rolle	6^{5}	4
5	(Guatemala) C Díaz Figueroa	7^{7}	6
3	(Mexico) B Rodríguez	7	6
(El Salvador) R Arévalo	5	3
(United States Virgin Islands) N Bass	7^{14}	1	1
7	(Venezuela) LD Martínez	6^{12}	6	6

Quarterfinals
1	(Dominican Republic) V Estrella Burgos	6	6
5	(Guatemala) C Díaz Figueroa	4	1
3	(Mexico) B Rodríguez	7^{7}	6
7	(Venezuela) LD Martínez	6^{0}	4

Semifinals
1	(Dominican Republic) V Estrella Burgos	7^{9}	7
3	(Mexico) B Rodríguez	6^{7}	5

==== Bottom half ====
First Round
8	(Haiti) O Sajous	6	6
(Guatemala) J Urigüen	3	2
(Dominican Republic) J Hernández-Fernández	6	6
(Costa Rica) E Naranjo	1	2
(Trinidad and Tobago) Y Williams	2	1
(Puerto Rico) A Llompart	6	6
(The Bahamas) D Mullings	1	4
4	(El Salvador) M Arévalo	6	6
6	(Venezuela) R Recarte	5	7	6
(Barbados) H Lewis	7	5	2
(United States Virgin Islands) B Oldfield	6	6
(British Virgin Islands) D Anselm	2	2
(Bermuda) G Manders	6	6
(Saint Vincent and the Grenadines) J Tash	0	4

Second Round
8	(Haiti) O Sajous	3	6	6
(Dominican Republic) J Hernández-Fernández	6	1	2
(Puerto Rico) A Llompart	2	4
4	(El Salvador) M Arévalo	6	6
6	(Venezuela) R Recarte	6	6
(United States Virgin Islands) B Oldfield	2	1
(Bermuda) G Manders	4	2
2	(Mexico) D Garza	6	6

Quarterfinals
8	(Haiti) O Sajous	1	3
4	(El Salvador) M Arévalo	6	6
6	(Venezuela) R Recarte	0	3
2	(Mexico) D Garza	6	6

Semifinals
4	(El Salvador) M Arévalo	4	2
2	(Mexico) D Garza	6	6

== Men's doubles ==
Quarterfinals
1	(Mexico) Luis Díaz Barriga (Mexico) César Ramírez	7^{7}	6
(Haiti) Joel Allen (Haiti) Olivier Sajous	6^{3}	4
3	(Dominican Republic) Víctor Estrella (Dominican Republic) José Hernández	w/o
(Puerto Rico) Alex Llompart (Puerto Rico) Jose Perdomo
(The Bahamas) Devin Mullings (The Bahamas) Marvin Rolle	6	6
4	(Guatemala) Christopher Díaz Figueroa (Guatemala) Sebastien Vidal	4	2
(Barbados) Darian King (Barbados) Haydn Lewis	4	6^{6}
(Venezuela) José de Armas (Venezuela) Piero Luisi	6	7^{8}

Semifinals
1	(Mexico) Luis Díaz Barriga (Mexico) César Ramírez	6	6
(Puerto Rico) Alex Llompart (Puerto Rico) Jose Perdomo	2	2
(The Bahamas) Devin Mullings (The Bahamas) Marvin Rolle	6	4	[3]
(Venezuela) José de Armas (Venezuela) Piero Luisi	4	6	[10]

Final
1	(Mexico) Luis Díaz Barriga (Mexico) César Ramírez	6	3	[7]
(Venezuela) José de Armas (Venezuela) Piero Luisi	4	6	[10]

== Women's events ==
=== Women's singles ===
Quarterfinals
(The Bahamas) Larika Russell	7	6
(Dominican Republic) Francesca Segarelli	5	2
3	(Puerto Rico) Monica Puig	6	6
6	(Mexico) Giuliana Olmos	3	2
5	(The Bahamas) Kerrie Cartwright	4	1
4	(Venezuela) Adriana Pérez	6	6
(Guatemala) Cassandra Escobar	1	3
2	(Mexico) Alejandra Granillo	6	6

Semifinals
(The Bahamas) Larika Russell	1	2
3	(Puerto Rico) Monica Puig	6	6
4	(Venezuela) Adriana Pérez	6	6
2	(Mexico) Alejandra Granillo	4	1

Final
3	(Puerto Rico) Monica Puig	6	6
4	(Venezuela) Adriana Pérez	3	2

=== Women's doubles ===
Quarterfinals
1	(Mexico) Daniela Múñoz Gallegos (Mexico) Melissa Torres Sandoval	4	6	[11]
(Dominican Republic) Daysi Espinal (Dominican Republic) Francesca Segarelli	6	4	[13]
(United States Virgin Islands) Taylor Davis (United States Virgin Islands) Leah Dewilde	1	1
(Costa Rica) Melissa Golfin (Costa Rica) Camila Quesada	6	6
(The Bahamas) Nikkita Fountain (The Bahamas) Larika Russell	1	6	[10]
3	(Puerto Rico) Monica Puig (Puerto Rico) Jessica Roland	6	4	[8]
(Bermuda) Caitlin Gordon (Bermuda) Tara Lambert	0	0
2	(Venezuela) Andrea Gámiz (Venezuela) Mariana Muci	6	6

Semifinals
(Dominican Republic) Daysi Espinal (Dominican Republic) Francesca Segarelli	6	7^{7}
(Costa Rica) Melissa Golfin (Costa Rica) Camila Quesada	2	6^{4}
(The Bahamas) Nikkita Fountain (The Bahamas) Larika Russell	6	6
2	(Venezuela) Andrea Gámiz (Venezuela) Mariana Muci	4	4

Final
(Dominican Republic) Daysi Espinal (Dominican Republic) Francesca Segarelli	0	6	[11]
(The Bahamas) Nikkita Fountain (The Bahamas) Larika Russell	6	4	[13]

== Mixed doubles ==
=== Seeds ===
1. (Mexico) Daniel Garza / Melissa Torres Sandoval (Champions; gold medalists)
2. (Venezuela) José de Armas / Adriana Pérez (Final; silver medalists)
3. (Puerto Rico) Alexander Llompart / Monica Puig (Semifinals; bronze medalists)
4. (Dominican Republic) José Hernández / Chandra Capozzi (Semifinals; bronze medalists)

=== Draw ===
First round
(Costa Rica) Esteban Vargas (Costa Rica) Camila Quesada	5	6	[10]
(United States Virgin Islands) Brian Oldfield (United States Virgin Islands) Taylor Davis	7	1	[7]
(Barbados) Darian King (Barbados) Ancia Ifill	3	4
(The Bahamas) Rodney Carey (The Bahamas) Kerrie Cartwright	6	6
(Bermuda) Gavin Manders (Bermuda) Jacklyn Lambert	3	2
(Guatemala) Andrés Bucaro (Guatemala) Kirsten-Andrea Weedon	6	6

Quarterfinals
1	(Mexico) Daniel Garza (Mexico) Melissa Torres Sandoval	6	6
(Saint Vincent and the Grenadines) Kirk da Silva (Saint Vincent and the Grenadines) Roxann Williams	0	1
3	(Puerto Rico) Alexander Llompart (Puerto Rico) Monica Puig	6	6
(Costa Rica) Esteban Vargas (Costa Rica) Camila Quesada	1	2
(The Bahamas) Rodney Carey (The Bahamas) Kerrie Cartwright	6	3	[7]
4	(Dominican Republic) José Hernández (Dominican Republic) Chandra Capozzi	4	6	[10]
(Guatemala) Andrés Bucaro (Guatemala) Kirsten-Andrea Weedon	2	1
2	(Venezuela) José de Armas (Venezuela) Adriana Pérez	6	6

Semifinals
1	(Mexico) Daniel Garza (Mexico) Melissa Torres Sandoval	7^{7}	7^{7}
3	(Puerto Rico) Alexander Llompart (Puerto Rico) Monica Puig	6^{4}	6^{4}
4	(Dominican Republic) José Hernández (Dominican Republic) Chandra Capozzi	1	2
2	(Venezuela) José de Armas (Venezuela) Adriana Pérez	6	6

Gold medal match
1	(Mexico) Daniel Garza (Mexico) Melissa Torres Sandoval	7^{7}	4	[12]
2	(Venezuela) José de Armas (Venezuela) Adriana Pérez	6^{5}	6	[10]
