= RUM Tennis Courts =

Courts at University of Puerto Rico Mayagüez campus

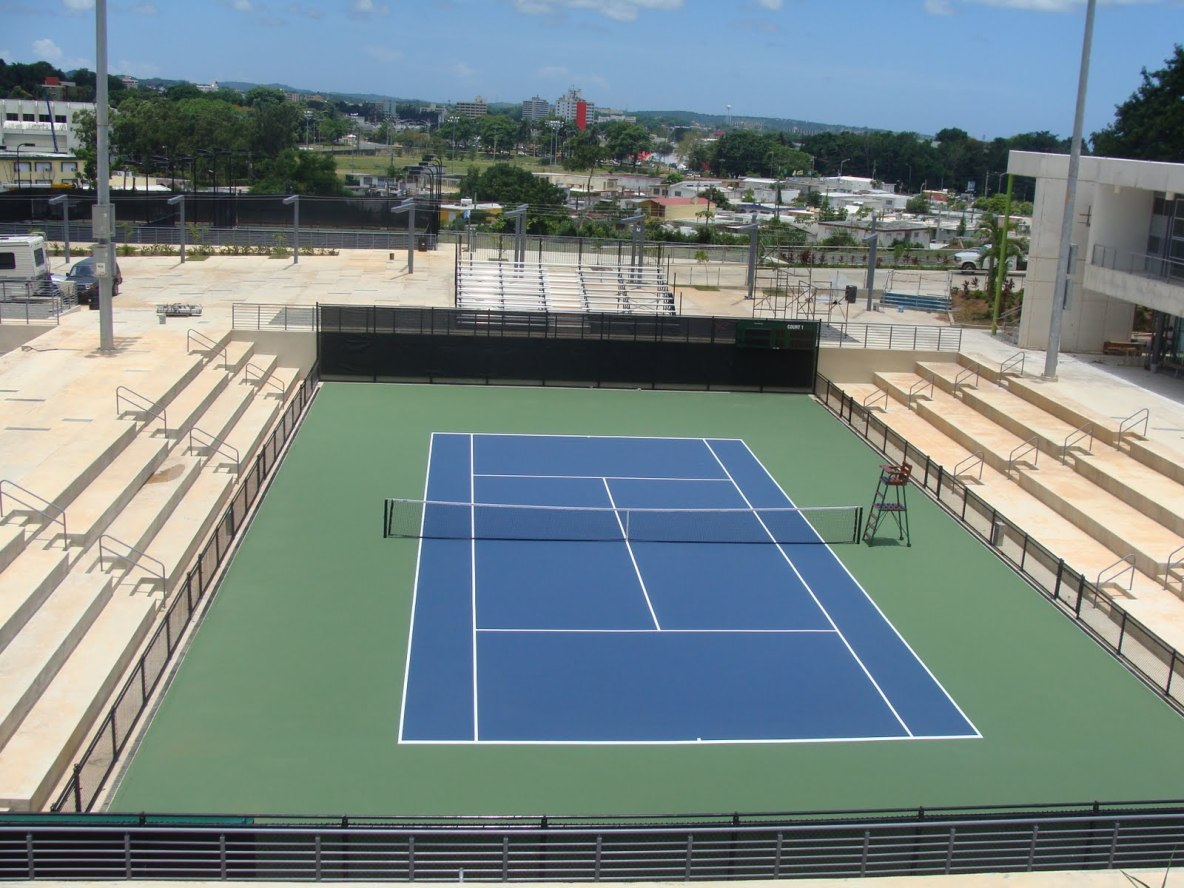
- Interactive map of RUM Tennis Courts
- Full name: Pedro “Golo” Laracuente Matías Tennis Courts
- Location: UPRM; Barrio Miradero; Mayagüez, Puerto Rico
- Coordinates: 18°12′59.18″N 67°08′40.45″W
- Owner: Autoridad para el Financiamiento de la Infraestructura (AFI)
- Capacity: 3,200 (tennis)
- Surface: Outdoors

Construction
- Opened: 2010
- Cost: $9.7 million

Tenants
- 2010 Central American and Caribbean Games; 2011 Davis Cup Americas Zone Group II

The RUM Tennis Courts or the Pedro “Golo” Laracuente Tennis Courts is a tennis center at the University of Puerto Rico at Mayagüez in Mayagüez, Puerto Rico, as part of a sports complex with the RUM Natatorium and the RUM Racquetball Courts. Built in 2010 next to the natatorium, it held the 2010 Central American and Caribbean Games' tennis competitions. It was named after former UPRM tennis athlete and coach, Pedro “Golo” Laracuente, when his former-student Emily Viqueira retired her name from candidacy, feeling that "[her] name and Golo's were going to compete and that [she] did not want to compete with [her] teacher."

Of Puerto Rico's approximately hundred tennis courts, eight are located at the complex, with two of these being principal courts, since they are flanked by cement bleachers on both sides. It is the permanent home of the UPRM's tennis club, Mayagüez RaCktenis, whose membership costs range between $100.00 to $250.00. Its use is usually limited to the UPRM students, varsity athletes and Mayagüez RaCktenis members. However, other local clubs may also use the space. The courts aren't used for tennis exclusively, as the space can be rented and some activities, such as the UPRM Meteorology Festival, are held there.
