= International Tennis Hall of Fame Champions Cup =

The International Tennis Hall of Fame Champions Cup is a professional tennis tournament which is part of the Outback Champions Series. It was formerly known as the Gibson Guitars Champions Cup. The 2008 event will take place August 13–17, 2008, in Newport, Rhode Island, hosted by the International Tennis Hall of Fame.

== Results ==
Year	Champion	Runner-up	Score	Ref
2009	Pat Cash	Jim Courier	6-3, 6-4	
2008	Pat Cash	Jim Courier	6-3, 6-4	
2007	Todd Martin	John McEnroe	7-5, 7-5	
