= Alejandro Mendoza (tennis) =

Bolivian tennis player

- Country (sports): Bolivia
- Born: 2 February 1990 (age 36) La Paz, Bolivia
- Height: 1.83 m (6 ft 0 in)
- Retired: 2022 (last match played)
- Plays: Right-handed (two-handed backhand)
- Prize money: $51,436

Singles
- Career record: 0–0 (at ATP Tour level, Grand Slam level, and in Davis Cup)
- Career titles: 0 ITF
- Highest ranking: No. 741 (1 August 2016)

Doubles
- Career record: 3–0 (at ATP Tour level, Grand Slam level, and in Davis Cup)
- Career titles: 1 ITF
- Highest ranking: No. 511 (18 July 2022)
- Last updated on: 1 December 2025.

Alejandro Mendoza (born 2 February 1990) is a Bolivian former tennis player.

Mendoza has a career high ATP singles ranking of No. 741 achieved on 1 August 2016. He also has a career high ATP doubles ranking of No. 511 achieved on 18 July 2022.

Mendoza represents Bolivia at the Davis Cup where he has a W/L record of 3–0.
