= José Benítez (tennis) =

Paraguayan tennis player

- Country (sports): Paraguay
- Born: 28 February 1990 (age 35)
- Turned pro: 2007
- Prize money: $4,743 US

Singles
- Career record: 1–1 (ATP Tour level, Grand Slam level, and Davis Cup)
- Highest ranking: No. 1015 (7 February 2011)
- Current ranking: No. 1057 (2 July 2011)

Doubles
- Career record: 0–1 (ATP Tour level, Grand Slam level, and Davis Cup)
- Highest ranking: No. 930 (7 March 2011)
- Last updated on: 7 September 2011.

José Orlando Benítez (born 28 February 1990) is a tennis player from Paraguay. Benítez was member of the 2011 Paraguay Davis Cup team.
