= Devin Mullings =

Bahamian tennis player (born 1985)

- Country (sports): Bahamas
- Residence: The Bahamas
- Born: 4 October 1985 (age 40) Freeport, Bahamas
- Height: 5'8
- Turned pro: 2006
- Retired: 2011
- Plays: Left handed (two handed backhand)

Singles
- Career record: 6–8 (at ATP Tour-level, Grand Slam-level, and in Davis Cup)
- Highest ranking: No. 886 (20 August 2007)

Other tournaments
- Olympic Games: 1st round (2008)

Doubles
- Career record: 0–4 (at ATP Tour-level, Grand Slam-level, and in Davis Cup)
- Career titles: 0
- Last updated on: 4 October 2013.

Devin Mullings
Medal record

Representing Bahamas

Men's Tennis

Central American and Caribbean Games
| Bronze medal – third place | 2010 Mayagüez | Men's Doubles |

Devin Mullings (born 4 October 1985 in the Bahamas) is a professional tennis player.

Mullings represents the Bahamas and has appeared in 17 Davis Cup ties for his country since 2002. He has an ATP tour win–loss record of 6–8 primarily through his Davis Cup exploits. He has played one main draw "Challenger" singles event, in Quito, Ecuador in 2007, where he reached the second round.

Mullings has competed in several "Futures" events. He reached a career-high ranking of World No. 886 in August 2007.

== Career ==
=== 2008 Beijing Olympics ===
Mullings appeared in the men's singles tournament at the 2008 Beijing Olympics in August 2008 as an alternate. He lost to the number 52 ranked Agustín Calleri from Argentina 6–1, 6–1 in the opening round.
