= Marvin Rolle =

Bahamian tennis player (born 1983)

- Country (sports): Bahamas
- Residence: Nassau, Bahamas
- Born: 15 November 1983 (age 42) Nassau, Bahamas
- Height: 5 ft 11 in (1.80 m)
- Plays: Right-handed
- Prize money: US$6,403

Singles
- Career record: 0–6
- Highest ranking: No. 1304 (13 September 2010)

Doubles
- Career record: 2–6
- Highest ranking: No. 681 (12 September 2011)
Medal record
Representing Bahamas
Central American and Caribbean Games
Bronze medal – third place	2010 Mayagüez	Men's Doubles
- Last updated on: 1 June 2018.

Marvin Rolle (born 15 November 1983) is a professional male tennis player from The Bahamas.

Rolle reached his highest individual ranking on the ATP Tour on 13 September 2010, when he became World number 1304. He primarily plays on the Futures circuit.

Rolle is a member of the Bahamian Davis Cup team, having posted a 14–15 record in singles and a 23–17 record in doubles in fifty-one ties played since 2001.

Rolle has represented The Bahamas in multiple international competitions. Rolle partnered with countryman Devin Mullings in the men's doubles competition at the 2010 Central American and Caribbean Games, winning the bronze medal. Rolle also represented The Bahamas at the 2010 Commonwealth Games and the 2007 and 2011 Pan American Games.

== Doubles titles (2) ==
Legend ATP Challenger Tour (0) Future Tour (2)	Titles by surface Hard (1) Clay (1) Grass (0) Carpet (0)

No.	Date	Tournament	Surface	Partnering	Opponents in the final	Score
1.	6 September 2010	Mexico F7	Hard	(Barbados) Haydn Lewis	(Mexico) Fernando Cabrera (Mexico) Pablo Martínez	6–2, 7–5
2.	17 January 2011	U.S.A. F2	Clay	(Barbados) Haydn Lewis	(South Korea) Cho Soong-jae (South Korea) Kim Hyun-joon	6–4, 6–3
