= Alex Llompart =

Puerto Rican tennis player (born 1990)

Alexander Gabriel Llompart Filardi
- Country (sports): Puerto Rico
- Born: May 5, 1990 (age 35) San Juan, Puerto Rico
- Height: 5 ft 9 in (175 cm)
- Plays: Right-handed
- Prize money: $16,877

Singles
- Career record: 6-5
- Career titles: 0
- Highest ranking: No. 725 (December 23, 2013)

Grand Slam singles results
- French Open Junior: Q1 (2008)
- US Open Junior: 3R (2008)

Doubles
- Career record: 3-4
- Career titles: 0
- Highest ranking: No. 232 (July 21, 2014)

Grand Slam doubles results
- US Open Junior: SF (2008)
- Last updated on: 6 July 2017.

Alex Llompart
Medal record

Representing Puerto Rico

Men's Tennis

Central American and Caribbean Games
Bronze medal – third place	2010 Mayagüez	Men's Doubles
Bronze medal – third place	2010 Mayagüez	Mixed Doubles

Alex Llompart (Alexander Gabriel Llompart Filardi) (born May 5, 1990) is a professional male tennis player from Puerto Rico.

Llompart reached his highest individual ranking on the ATP Tour on December 23, 2013, when he became World number 725. He reached his highest doubles ranking on July 21, 2014, when he became World number 232.

Llompart is a member of the Puerto Rican Davis Cup team, having posted a 15–7 record in singles and a 6–5 record in doubles in twenty ties played since 2007.

Llompart has represented Puerto Rico in multiple international competitions. Llompart partnered with countryman José Perdomo in the men's doubles competition at the 2010 Central American and Caribbean Games, winning the bronze medal. He also partnered with countrywoman Monica Puig in the mixed doubles competition at the 2010 Central American and Caribbean Games, winning the bronze medal. Llompart also represented Puerto Rico at the 2011 Pan American Games, reaching the second round in the men's singles competition and falling in the first round in the mixed doubles competition.

He is a seven-time Puerto Rico singles champion (2008–2014).

== Doubles titles (5) ==
Legend ATP Challenger Tour (0) Future Tour (5)	Titles by surface Hard (4) Clay (1) Grass (0) Carpet (0)

No.	Date	Tournament	Surface	Partnering	Opponents in the final	Score
1.	September 26, 2011	Mexico F12	Hard	(El Salvador) Marcelo Arévalo	(Mexico) Javier Herrera-Eguiluz (United States) Amrit Narasimhan	6–3, 6–0

== See also ==
- Carmelo Filardi
- Filardi House
- Vincente Filardi
