= 2011 Manta Open – Singles =

Singles
- 2011 Manta Open

Final
- Champion: (Argentina) Brian Dabul
- Runner-up: (Argentina) Facundo Argüello
- Score: 6–1, 6–3

Events
Singles	Doubles
← 2010 ·	Manta Open	· 2012 →

Go Soeda was the defending champion, but decided not to participate.

Brian Dabul won the title, defeating Facundo Argüello 6–1, 6–3 in the final.

== Seeds ==
1. (South Africa) Izak van der Merwe (first round)
2. (Brazil) Rogério Dutra da Silva (semifinals)
3. (Colombia) Carlos Salamanca (withdrew due to left shoulder injury)
4. (Argentina) Brian Dabul (champion)
5. (Dominican Republic) Víctor Estrella (first round)
6. (Argentina) Sebastián Decoud (first round)
7. (Brazil) Fernando Romboli (first round)
8. (Argentina) Facundo Argüello (final)

== Draw ==
=== Key ===
- Q = Qualifier
- WC = Wild card
- LL = Lucky loser
- Alt = Alternate
- SE = Special exempt
- PR = Protected ranking
- ITF = ITF entry
- JE = Junior exempt
- w/o = Walkover
- r = Retired
- d = Defaulted
- SR = Special ranking

=== Finals ===
Semifinals
(Italy) Riccardo Ghedin	3	4
8	(Argentina) Facundo Argüello	6	6
4	(Argentina) Brian Dabul	0	6	6
2	(Brazil) Rogério Dutra da Silva	6	4	4

Final
8	(Argentina) Facundo Argüello	1	3
4	(Argentina) Brian Dabul	6	6

=== Top half ===
First round
1	(South Africa) I van der Merwe	1	1
(Italy) R Ghedin	6	6
(Brazil) T Fernandes	4	6	6
Q	(Colombia) JS Gómez	6	1	2
(Argentina) Diego Schwartzman	4	6	3
Q	(Ecuador) I Endara	6	4	6
(Uruguay) M Felder	2	6	6
6	(Argentina) S Decoud	6	4	3
LL	(Peru) M Echazú	3	4
Q	(Colombia) N Barrientos	6	6
(South Africa) R Klaasen	3	7^{7}	6
(Colombia) E Struvay	6	6^{4}	1
(Brazil) R Hocevar	7^{7}	2	7^{7}
(Italy) M Marrai	6^{5}	6	6^{2}
WC	(Ecuador) Galo Barrezueta	2	0
8	(Argentina) F Argüello	6	6

Second round
(Italy) R Ghedin	7^{7}	7^{7}
(Brazil) T Fernandes	6^{3}	6^{2}
Q	(Ecuador) I Endara	6	6
(Uruguay) M Felder	4	3
Q	(Colombia) N Barrientos	2	4
(South Africa) R Klaasen	6	6
(Brazil) R Hocevar	6^{4}	7	2
8	(Argentina) F Argüello	7^{7}	5	6

Quarterfinals
(Italy) R Ghedin	6	6
Q	(Ecuador) I Endara	4	2
(South Africa) R Klaasen	4	4
8	(Argentina) F Argüello	6	6

Semifinals
(Italy) R Ghedin	3	4
8	(Argentina) F Argüello	6	6

=== Bottom half ===
First round
7	(Brazil) F Romboli	0	6	6^{1}
(Brazil) D Dutra da Silva	6	2	7^{7}
WC	(Ecuador) D Hidalgo	4	4
(Ecuador) JC Campozano	6	6
Q	(Ecuador) E Gómez	2	2
(United States) K Kim	6	6
(Japan) T Matsui	2	4
4	(Argentina) B Dabul	6	6
5	(Dominican Republic) V Estrella	6^{2}	7^{7}	1
(Chile) G Rivera-Aránguiz	7^{7}	6^{5}	6
(Argentina) Guillermo Durán	6	4	6^{3}
(Colombia) A González	2	6	7^{7}
(Mexico) D Garza	6	6
WC	(Ecuador) R Quiroz	3	2
(United States) Joseph Correa	0	0
2	(Brazil) R Dutra da Silva	6	6

Second round
(Brazil) D Dutra da Silva	2	2
(Ecuador) JC Campozano	6	6
(United States) K Kim	3	1^{r}
4	(Argentina) B Dabul	6	0
(Chile) G Rivera-Aránguiz	6	6
(Colombia) A González	2	1
(Mexico) D Garza	4	1
2	(Brazil) R Dutra da Silva	6	6

Quarterfinals
(Ecuador) JC Campozano	2	5
4	(Argentina) B Dabul	6	7
(Chile) G Rivera-Aránguiz	1	2
2	(Brazil) R Dutra da Silva	6	6

Semifinals
4	(Argentina) B Dabul	0	6	6
2	(Brazil) R Dutra da Silva	6	4	4
