= 2011 Manta Open – Doubles =

Doubles
- 2011 Manta Open

Final
- Champions: (Argentina) Brian Dabul (South Africa) Izak van der Merwe
- Runners-up: (United States) John Paul Fruttero (South Africa) Raven Klaasen
- Score: 6–1, 6–7^{(7–2)}, [11–9]

Events
Singles	Doubles
← 2010 ·	Manta Open	· 2012 →

Ryler DeHeart and Pierre-Ludovic Duclos were the defending champions, but chose not to play this year.

Brian Dabul and Izak van der Merwe won the final 6–1, 6–7^{(7–2)}, [11–9], against John Paul Fruttero and Raven Klaasen.

== Seeds ==
1. (Argentina) Brian Dabul / (South Africa) Izak van der Merwe (champions)
2. (United States) John Paul Fruttero / (South Africa) Raven Klaasen (inalterable)
3. (Uruguay) Marcel Felder / (Mexico) Daniel Garza (semifinals)
4. (Dominican Republic) Víctor Estrella / (Colombia) Alejandro González (quarterfinals)

== Draw ==
=== Key ===
- Q = Qualifier
- WC = Wild card
- LL = Lucky loser
- Alt = Alternate
- ITF = ITF entry
- PR = Protected ranking
- SR = Special ranking
- SE = Special exempt
- JE = Junior exempt
- JR = Junior Accelerator Programme entrant
- CO = College Accelerator Programme entrant
- NG = Next Gen Accelerator Program entrant
- w/o = Walkover
- r = Retired
- d = Defaulted

=== Draw ===
First round
1	(Argentina) B Dabul (South Africa) I van der Merwe	6	6
(Argentina) F Arguello (Argentina) Diego Schwartzman	1	1
(Italy) R Ghedin (Italy) M Marrai	2	1
(Brazil) D Dutra da Silva (Brazil) F Romboli	6	6
4	(Dominican Republic) V Estrella (Colombia) A González	7^{7}	6
(Brazil) T Fernandes (Ecuador) R Quiroz	6^{5}	4
(Argentina) Guillermo Durán (Chile) G Rivera-Aránguiz	6	4	[10]
WC	(United States) Sam Barnett (United States) K Kim	1	6	[2]
(Peru) M Echazú (Ecuador) I Endara	6	6
WC	(Ecuador) D Hidalgo (Colombia) Walter Valarezo	2
(Brazil) R Dutra da Silva (Brazil) R Hocevar	3	4
3	(Uruguay) M Felder (Mexico) D Garza	6	6
(Argentina) S Decoud (Japan) T Matsui	3	6	[10]
WC	(Colombia) N Barrientos (United States) Joseph Correa	6	1	[4]
(Ecuador) JC Campozano (Colombia) E Struvay	6	3	[6]
2	(United States) JP Fruttero (South Africa) R Klaasen	3	6	[10]

Quarterfinals
1	(Argentina) B Dabul (South Africa) I van der Merwe	6^{5}	6	[10]
(Brazil) D Dutra da Silva (Brazil) F Romboli	7^{7}	[2]
4	(Dominican Republic) V Estrella (Colombia) A González	2	[9]
(Argentina) Guillermo Durán (Chile) G Rivera-Aránguiz	0	6	[11]
(Peru) M Echazú (Ecuador) I Endara	4	6^{7}
3	(Uruguay) M Felder (Mexico) D Garza	6	7^{9}
(Argentina) S Decoud (Japan) T Matsui	3
2	(United States) JP Fruttero (South Africa) R Klaasen	6	6

Semifinals
1	(Argentina) B Dabul (South Africa) I van der Merwe	6	7^{9}
(Argentina) Guillermo Durán (Chile) G Rivera-Aránguiz	1	6^{7}
3	(Uruguay) M Felder (Mexico) D Garza	6	4	[9]
2	(United States) JP Fruttero (South Africa) R Klaasen	3	6	[11]

Final
1	(Argentina) B Dabul (South Africa) I van der Merwe	6	6^{2}	[11]
2	(United States) JP Fruttero (South Africa) R Klaasen	1	7	[9]
