= 2009 Manta Open – Trofeo Ricardo Delgado Aray – Doubles =

Trofeo Ricardo Delgado Aray – Doubles
- 2009 Manta Open – Trofeo Ricardo Delgado Aray

Final
- Champions: (Brazil) Ricardo Hocevar (Brazil) André Miele
- Runners-up: (Mexico) Santiago González; KTO JEST 2?
- Score: 6–1, 2–6, [10–7]

Events
Singles	Doubles
← 2008 ·	Manta Open – Trofeo Ricardo Delgado Aray	· 2010 →

Alejandro González and Eduardo Struvay were the defending champions.
Struvay chose to not participate and González teamed up with Eduardo Struvay, but they lost to Alejandro Fabbri and Guido Pella in the first round.
Ricardo Hocevar and André Miele defeated Santiago González and Horacio Zeballos in the final.

== Seeds ==
1st-seeded pair received a bye in the first round.

1. (Mexico) Santiago González / (Argentina) Horacio Zeballos (final)
2. (Brazil) Ricardo Hocevar / (Brazil) André Miele (champions)
3. (Colombia) Alejandro González / (United States) Eric Nunez (first round)
4. (Mexico) Bruno Echagaray / (Dominican Republic) Víctor Estrella (semifinals)

== Draw ==
=== Key ===
- Q = Qualifier
- WC = Wild card
- LL = Lucky loser
- Alt = Alternate
- SE = Special exempt
- PR = Protected ranking
- ITF = ITF entry
- JE = Junior exempt
- w/o = Walkover
- r = Retired
- d = Defaulted
- SR = Special ranking

=== Draw ===
First round
(Spain) G Alcaide (Russia) N Nesterov	6	4	[3]
WC	(Ecuador) G Escobar (Ecuador) W Valarezo	3	6	[10]
4	(Mexico) B Echagaray (Dominican Republic) V Estrella
(Italy) L D'Agord (New Zealand) D King-Turner	w/o
(Uruguay) A Behar (Uruguay) M Felder	4	6^{2}
(Brazil) A Bonatto (Ecuador) JC Campozano	6	7
WC	(Ecuador) E Gómez (Ecuador) J Zunino	6	6
WC	(Ecuador) C Avellán (Ecuador) I Endara	2	2
(Argentina) A Fabbri (Argentina) G Pella	6	6^{2}	[10]
3	(Colombia) A González (United States) E Nunez	4	7	[6]
(United States) JP Fruttero (France) V Millot	6	6
(Ecuador) G Lapentti (Spain) F Vicente	1	4
(Denmark) K Pless (United Kingdom) J Ward	2	1
2	(Brazil) R Hocevar (Brazil) A Miele	6	6

Quarterfinals
1	(Mexico) S González (Argentina) H Zeballos	6	6
WC	(Ecuador) G Escobar (Ecuador) W Valarezo	1	4
4	(Mexico) B Echagaray (Dominican Republic) V Estrella
(Brazil) A Bonatto (Ecuador) JC Campozano	w/o
WC	(Ecuador) E Gómez (Ecuador) J Zunino	3	6	[10]
(Argentina) A Fabbri (Argentina) G Pella	6	4	[8]
(United States) JP Fruttero (France) V Millot	3	4
2	(Brazil) R Hocevar (Brazil) A Miele	6	6

Semifinals
1	(Mexico) S González (Argentina) H Zeballos	6	6
4	(Mexico) B Echagaray (Dominican Republic) V Estrella	3	2
WC	(Ecuador) E Gómez (Ecuador) J Zunino	1	6^{6}
2	(Brazil) R Hocevar (Brazil) A Miele	6	7

Finals
1	(Mexico) S González (Argentina) H Zeballos	1	6	[7]
2	(Brazil) R Hocevar (Brazil) A Miele	6	2	[10]
