= 2010 Manta Open – Trofeo Ricardo Delgado Aray – Singles =

Trofeo Ricardo Delgado Aray – Singles
- 2010 Manta Open – Trofeo Ricardo Delgado Aray

Final
- Champion: (Japan) Go Soeda
- Runner-up: (United States) Ryler DeHeart
- Score: 7–6(5), 6–2

Events
Singles	Doubles
← 2009 ·	Manta Open – Trofeo Ricardo Delgado Aray	· 2011 →

Horacio Zeballos was the defending champion; however. he chose to compete in Rome instead.
Go Soeda won in the final 7–6(5), 6–2 against Ryler DeHeart.

== Seeds ==
1. (United States) Rajeev Ram (first round)
2. (United States) Kevin Kim (second round)
3. (Argentina) Brian Dabul (first round)
4. (Australia) Greg Jones (second round)
5. (Japan) Go Soeda (champion)
6. (Brazil) Ricardo Hocevar (semifinals)
7. (United States) Ryler DeHeart (finals)
8. (Argentina) Sebastián Decoud (first round)

== Draw ==
=== Key ===
- Q = Qualifier
- WC = Wild card
- LL = Lucky loser
- Alt = Alternate
- SE = Special exempt
- PR = Protected ranking
- ITF = ITF entry
- JE = Junior exempt
- w/o = Walkover
- r = Retired
- d = Defaulted
- SR = Special ranking

=== Finals ===
Semifinals
6	(Brazil) Ricardo Hocevar	2	1
7	(United States) Ryler DeHeart	6	6
(South Korea) Im Kyu-tae	2	0^{r}
5	(Japan) Go Soeda	6	2

Final
7	(United States) Ryler DeHeart	6^{5}	2
5	(Japan) Go Soeda	7	6

=== Top half ===
First round
1	(United States) R Ram	5	2
(United Kingdom) J Ward	7	6
(Spain) G Alcaide	2	7	4
Q	(Ecuador) I Endara	6	6^{3}	6
(Spain) G Olaso	2	0^{r}
Q	(Germany) S Rieschick	6	2
(United States) B Evans	6	1	4
6	(Brazil) R Hocevar	3	6	6
4	(Australia) G Jones	6	6
WC	(United States) Carlton Fiorentino	2	4
WC	(Ecuador) Diego Acosta	6^{3}	1
(Australia) J Sirianni	7	6
WC	(Ecuador) JC Campozano	7	4	1
(Canada) P-L Duclos	6^{3}	6	6
Q	(Switzerland) R Valent	6	2	5
7	(United States) R DeHeart	3	6	7

Second round
(United Kingdom) J Ward	6	6
Q	(Ecuador) I Endara	0	3
Q	(Germany) S Rieschick	2	6	5^{r}
6	(Brazil) R Hocevar	6	2	6
4	(Australia) G Jones	6	5	6^{4}
(Australia) J Sirianni	1	7	7
(Canada) P-L Duclos	6^{4}	3
7	(United States) R DeHeart	7	6

Quarterfinals
(United Kingdom) J Ward	6^{5}	6^{8}
6	(Brazil) R Hocevar	7	7
(Australia) J Sirianni	4	6	4
7	(United States) R DeHeart	6	2	6

Semifinals
6	(Brazil) R Hocevar	2	1
7	(United States) R DeHeart	6	6

=== Bottom half ===
First round
8	(Argentina) S Decoud	1	6	1
(South Korea) K-t Im	6	0	6
(Ecuador) G Lapentti	6	5	7
(Japan) T Ito	4	7	5
(Argentina) F Bagnis	6	7
WC	(Ecuador) E Gómez	1	6^{3}
(Spain) A Brugués-Davi	7	6
3	(Argentina) B Dabul	6^{5}	3
5	(Japan) G Soeda	6	4	6
(United States) B Reynolds	3	6	4
(United Kingdom) J Baker	5	7	6
(Argentina) Guido Pella	7	6^{2}	1
(Italy) R Ghedin	4	7	6
(Dominican Republic) V Estrella	6	5	2
Q	(Peru) M Echazú	3	3
2	(United States) K Kim	6	6

Second round
(South Korea) K-t Im	7	6
(Ecuador) G Lapentti	6^{8}	2
(Argentina) F Bagnis	4	3
(Spain) A Brugués-Davi	6	6
5	(Japan) G Soeda	6	3	6
(United Kingdom) J Baker	0	6	1
(Italy) R Ghedin	7	6
2	(United States) K Kim	5	4

Quarterfinals
(South Korea) K-t Im	6	5	6
(Spain) A Brugués-Davi	3	7	4
5	(Japan) G Soeda	6	6
(Italy) R Ghedin	3	3

Semifinals
(South Korea) K-t Im	2	0^{r}
5	(Japan) G Soeda	6	2
