= 2013 Manta Open – Doubles =

Doubles
- 2013 Manta Open

Final
- Champions: (El Salvador) Marcelo Arévalo (Peru) Sergio Galdós
- Runners-up: (Colombia) Alejandro González (Colombia) Carlos Salamanca
- Score: 6–3, 6–4

Events
Singles	Doubles
- Manta Open

Duilio Beretta and Renzo Olivo are the defending champions but Olivo decided no to participate.
Beretta played alongside Andrea Collarini and lost in the Quarterfinals to Nicolás Barrientos and Eduardo Struvay.
Marcelo Arévalo and Sergio Galdós defeated Alejandro González and Carlos Salamanca 6–3, 6–4 in the final.

== Seeds ==
1. (Ecuador) Julio César Campozano / (Canada) Peter Polansky (first round)
2. (Argentina) Facundo Argüello / (Dominican Republic) Víctor Estrella (semifinals)
3. (El Salvador) Marcelo Arévalo / (Peru) Sergio Galdós (champions)
4. (Colombia) Alejandro González / (Colombia) Carlos Salamanca (finals)

== Draw ==
Key

- Q = Qualifier
- WC = Wild card
- LL = Lucky loser
- Alt = Alternate
- ITF = ITF entry
- PR = Protected ranking
- SR = Special ranking
- SE = Special exempt
- JE = Junior exempt
- JR = Junior Accelerator Programme entrant
- CO = College Accelerator Programme entrant
- NG = Next Gen Accelerator Program entrant
- w/o = Walkover
- r = Retired
- d = Defaulted

=== Draw ===
First round
1	(Ecuador) JC Campozano (Canada) P Polansky
(Colombia) N Barrientos (Colombia) E Struvay	w/o
WC	(Ecuador) Alejandro José Gómez Estrada (Ecuador) D Hidalgo	2	2
(Peru) D Beretta (Argentina) A Collarini	6	6
4	(Colombia) A González (Colombia) C Salamanca	5	6	[11]
(Australia) G Jones (United States) G Ouellette	7	2	[9]
(Argentina) M Estévez (Dominican Republic) J Hernández	6	6
(Argentina) G Andreozzi (Brazil) F de Paula	3	2
(Colombia) Felipe Escobar (Colombia) M Quintero	4	2^{r}
WC	(United States) Sam Barnett (United States) J Witten	6	2
(Guatemala) C Díaz Figueroa (Ecuador) I Endara	5	3
3	(El Salvador) M Arévalo (Peru) S Galdós	7	6
(Chile) N Massú (Chile) G Rivera-Aránguiz	5	6^{6}
(Brazil) T Alves (Colombia) Felipe Mantilla	7	7^{8}
(Ecuador) E Gómez (Ecuador) R Quiroz	6^{4}	4
2	(Argentina) F Argüello (Dominican Republic) V Estrella	7^{7}	6

Quarterfinals
(Colombia) N Barrientos (Colombia) E Struvay	6	6
(Peru) D Beretta (Argentina) A Collarini	2	4
4	(Colombia) A González (Colombia) C Salamanca	6	7
(Argentina) M Estévez (Dominican Republic) J Hernández	1	5
WC	(United States) S Barnett (United States) J Witten	1	1
3	(El Salvador) M Arévalo (Peru) S Galdós	6	6
(Brazil) T Alves (Colombia) F Mantilla
2	(Argentina) F Argüello (Dominican Republic) V Estrella	w/o

Semifinals
(Colombia) N Barrientos (Colombia) E Struvay	6	2	[8]
4	(Colombia) A González (Colombia) C Salamanca	3	6	[10]
3	(El Salvador) M Arévalo (Peru) S Galdós	6	4	[10]
2	(Argentina) F Argüello (Dominican Republic) V Estrella	2	6	[8]

Final
4	(Colombia) A González (Colombia) C Salamanca	3	4
3	(El Salvador) M Arévalo (Peru) S Galdós	6	6
