= 2010 Manta Open – Trofeo Ricardo Delgado Aray – Doubles =

Trofeo Ricardo Delgado Aray – Doubles
- 2010 Manta Open – Trofeo Ricardo Delgado Aray

Final
- Champions: (United States) Ryler DeHeart (Canada) Pierre-Ludovic Duclos
- Runners-up: (Germany) Martin Emmrich (Sweden) Andreas Siljeström
- Score: 6–4, 7–5

Events
Singles	Doubles
← 2009 ·	Manta Open – Trofeo Ricardo Delgado Aray	· 2011 →

Ricardo Hocevar and André Miele were the defending champions, however Miele chose not to compete this year.
Hocevar partnered up with Guillermo Olaso. They withdrew before their semifinal match against Martin Emmrich and Andreas Siljeström.
Ryler DeHeart and Pierre-Ludovic Duclos won in the final 6–4, 7–5 against Emmrich and Siljeström.

== Seeds ==
1. (Germany) Martin Emmrich / (Sweden) Andreas Siljeström (final)
2. (United States) Ryler DeHeart / (Canada) Pierre-Ludovic Duclos (champions)
3. (Brazil) Ricardo Hocevar / (Spain) Guillermo Olaso (semifinals, withdrew)
4. (Spain) Arnau Brugués-Davi / (Dominican Republic) Víctor Estrella (semifinals)

== Draw ==
=== Key ===
- Q = Qualifier
- WC = Wild card
- LL = Lucky loser
- Alt = Alternate
- SE = Special exempt
- PR = Protected ranking
- ITF = ITF entry
- JE = Junior exempt
- w/o = Walkover
- r = Retired
- d = Defaulted
- SR = Special ranking

=== Draw ===
First round
1	(Germany) M Emmrich (Sweden) A Siljeström	6	6
(Ecuador) JC Campozano (Ecuador) E Gómez	2	4
(Italy) R Ghedin (Germany) S Rieschick	4	3
(Australia) G Jones (United Kingdom) J Ward	6	6
3	(Brazil) R Hocevar (Spain) G Olaso	6	6
(Ecuador) D Acosta (Ecuador) S Rivera	4	3
(Ecuador) G Barrezueta (Ecuador) C Luna Romero	1	1
(Spain) G Alcaide (Russia) N Nesterov	6	6
(Ecuador) R Quiroz (Ecuador) W Valarezo	3	6^{3}
(South Korea) KT Im (United States) K Kim	6	7
(United States) C Fiorentino (Australia) J Sirianni
4	(Spain) A Brugués-Davi (Dominican Republic) V Estrella	w/o
(Peru) M Echazú (Ecuador) I Endara	4	1
(Argentina) F Bagnis (Argentina) G Pella	6	6
(United States) B Evans (United States) B Reynolds	4	r
2	(United States) R DeHeart (Canada) P-L Duclos	4

Quarterfinals
1	(Germany) M Emmrich (Sweden) A Siljeström	6	6
(Australia) G Jones (United Kingdom) J Ward	1	2
3	(Brazil) R Hocevar (Spain) G Olaso	6	6
(Spain) G Alcaide (Russia) N Nesterov	0	2
(South Korea) KT Im (United States) K Kim	3	3	r
4	(Spain) A Brugués-Davi (Dominican Republic) V Estrella	6	4
(Argentina) F Bagnis (Argentina) G Pella	2	4
2	(United States) R DeHeart (Canada) P-L Duclos	6	6

Semifinals
1	(Germany) M Emmrich (Sweden) A Siljeström	w/o
3	(Brazil) R Hocevar (Spain) G Olaso
4	(Spain) A Brugués-Davi (Dominican Republic) V Estrella	6^{3}	6	[6]
2	(United States) R DeHeart (Canada) P-L Duclos	7	4	[10]

Finals
1	(Germany) M Emmrich (Sweden) A Siljeström	4	5
2	(United States) R DeHeart (Canada) P-L Duclos	6	7
