= 2013 Manta Open – Singles =

Singles
- 2013 Manta Open

Final
- Champion: (United States) Michael Russell
- Runner-up: (Australia) Greg Jones
- Score: 4–6, 6–0, 7–5

Events
Singles	Doubles
- Manta Open

Guido Pella was the defending champion, but decided not to participate.
Michael Russell defeated Greg Jones 4–6, 6–0, 7–5 in the final to win the title.

== Seeds ==
1. (United States) Michael Russell (champion)
2. (Argentina) Guido Andreozzi (first round)
3. (Colombia) Alejandro González (semifinals)
4. (Argentina) Facundo Argüello (semifinals)
5. (Brazil) Thiago Alves (first round)
6. (Ecuador) Julio César Campozano (second round)
7. (Canada) Peter Polansky (second round)
8. (Brazil) Fabiano de Paula (second round)

== Draw ==
Key

- Q = Qualifier
- WC = Wild card
- LL = Lucky loser
- Alt = Alternate
- ITF = ITF entry
- PR = Protected ranking
- SR = Special ranking
- SE = Special exempt
- JE = Junior exempt
- JR = Junior Accelerator Programme entrant
- CO = College Accelerator Programme entrant
- NG = Next Gen Accelerator Program entrant
- w/o = Walkover
- r = Retired
- d = Defaulted

=== Finals ===
Semifinals
1	(United States) Michael Russell	6	6
3	(Colombia) Alejandro González	2	1
4	(Argentina) Facundo Arguello	1	6	3
(Australia) Greg Jones	6	1	6

Final
1	(United States) Michael Russell	4	6	7
(Australia) Greg Jones	6	0	5

=== Top half ===
First round
1	(United States) M Russell	6	6
Q	(Colombia) Felipe Mantilla	1	2
Alt	(Colombia) M Quintero	6	6
(Chile) G Rivera Aránguiz	3	1
(United States) G Ouellette	6	6
Q	(Peru) S Galdós	3	4
(Dominican Republic) J Hernández	3	1
7	(Canada) P Polansky	6	6
3	(Colombia) A González	6	6
WC	(Chile) N Massú	3	2
(Dominican Republic) V Estrella	6	6
Q	(Colombia) E Struvay	3	1
(El Salvador) M Arévalo	6	6
Q	(Colombia) Andres Cabezas	1	4
(Colombia) C Salamanca	4	2
6	(Ecuador) JC Campozano	6	6

Second round
1	(United States) M Russell	2
Alt	(Colombia) M Quintero	0^{r}
(United States) G Ouellette	7^{7}	5	6
7	(Canada) P Polansky	6^{4}	7	4
3	(Colombia) A González	6	7^{10}
(Dominican Republic) V Estrella	3	6^{8}
(El Salvador) M Arévalo	6	6
6	(Ecuador) JC Campozano	0	1

Quarterfinals
1	(United States) M Russell	6	3	6
(United States) G Ouellette	3	6	3
3	(Colombia) A González	7^{7}	6
(El Salvador) M Arévalo	6^{3}	3

Semifinals
1	(United States) M Russell	6	6
3	(Colombia) A González	2	1

=== Bottom half ===
First round
8	(Brazil) F de Paula	4	6	7
(Peru) D Beretta	6	4	5
WC	(Ecuador) E Gómez	5	7	6
(United States) J Witten	7	5	1
(Guatemala) C Díaz Figueroa	7^{7}	6
Alt	(Argentina) JI Londero	6^{5}	3
WC	(Ecuador) D Hidalgo	3	3
4	(Argentina) F Argüello	6	6
5	(Brazil) T Alves	2	3
(Australia) G Jones	6	6
WC	(Ecuador) R Quiroz	6	6
(Colombia) N Barrientos	4	4
(Argentina) A Collarini	7	6
(Argentina) Maximiliano Estévez	5	3
Alt	(Ecuador) I Endara	7^{11}	2	6
2	(Argentina) G Andreozzi	6^{9}	6	2

Second round
8	(Brazil) F de Paula	6	6^{2}	1
WC	(Ecuador) E Gómez	2	7^{7}	6
(Guatemala) C Díaz Figueroa	3	3
4	(Argentina) F Argüello	6	6
(Australia) G Jones	6	6
WC	(Ecuador) R Quiroz	4	4
(Argentina) A Collarini	7	6
Alt	(Ecuador) I Endara	5	3

Quarterfinals
WC	(Ecuador) E Gómez	3	3
4	(Argentina) F Argüello	6	6
(Australia) G Jones	4	7^{7}	6
(Argentina) A Collarini	6	6^{3}	2

Semifinals
4	(Argentina) F Argüello	1	6	3
(Australia) G Jones	6	1	6
