= 2012 Manta Open – Singles =

Singles
- 2012 Manta Open

Final
- Champion: (Argentina) Guido Pella
- Runner-up: (Argentina) Maximiliano Estévez
- Score: 6–4, 7–5

Events
| Singles | Doubles |
- Manta Open

Brian Dabul was the defending champion, but decided not to participate.

Guido Pella won the title, defeating Maximiliano Estévez 6–4, 7–5 in the final.

== Seeds ==
1. (Brazil) João Souza (quarterfinals)
2. (Argentina) Guido Pella (champion)
3. (Dominican Republic) Víctor Estrella (quarterfinals)
4. (Argentina) Guido Andreozzi (second round)
5. (Argentina) Agustín Velotti (second round)
6. (Colombia) Carlos Salamanca (second round)
7. (Ecuador) Júlio César Campozano (quarterfinals)
8. (Argentina) Facundo Argüello (semifinals)

== Draw ==
Key

- Q = Qualifier
- WC = Wild card
- LL = Lucky loser
- Alt = Alternate
- ITF = ITF entry
- PR = Protected ranking
- SR = Special ranking
- SE = Special exempt
- JE = Junior exempt
- JR = Junior Accelerator Programme entrant
- CO = College Accelerator Programme entrant
- NG = Next Gen Accelerator Program entrant
- w/o = Walkover
- r = Retired
- d = Defaulted

=== Finals ===
Semifinals
(Chile) Jorge Aguilar | 6^{3} | 6 | 0
(Argentina) Maximiliano Estévez | 7^{7} | 4 | 6
8 | (Argentina) Facundo Argüello | 5 | 3
2 | (Argentina) Guido Pella | 7 | 6

Final
(Argentina) Maximiliano Estévez | 4 | 5
2 | (Argentina) Guido Pella | 6 | 7

=== Top half ===
First round
1/WC | (Brazil) J Souza | 6 | 6
Q | (Japan) Y Ito | 4 | 4
WC | (Ecuador) R Quiroz | 7^{7} | 6
(Colombia) N Barrientos | 6^{4} | 4
(Chile) J Aguilar | 6 | 5 | 6
(Peru) D Beretta | 1 | 7 | 1
(Brazil) F Romboli | 6 | 5 | 2
5 | (Argentina) A Velotti | 4 | 7 | 6
4 | (Argentina) G Andreozzi | 6 | 7^{8}
(Guatemala) C Díaz Figueroa | 4 | 6^{6}
Q | (Ecuador) I Endara | 4 | 2
(Argentina) M Estévez | 6 | 6
(Argentina) A Molteni | 3 | 4
(Australia) G Jones | 6 | 6
WC | (Ecuador) Galo Barrezueta | 0^{r}
6 | (Colombia) C Salamanca | 4

Second round
1/WC | (Brazil) J Souza | 6^{5} | 7^{8} | 7
WC | (Ecuador) R Quiroz | 7^{7} | 6^{6} | 5
(Chile) J Aguilar | 6 | 3 | 6
5 | (Argentina) A Velotti | 3 | 6 | 0
4 | (Argentina) G Andreozzi | 1 | 6 | 3
(Argentina) M Estévez | 6 | 2 | 6
(Australia) G Jones | 3 | 6 | 6
6 | (Colombia) C Salamanca | 6 | 4 | 4

Quarterfinals
1/WC | (Brazil) J Souza | 6 | 3 | 2
(Chile) J Aguilar | 4 | 6 | 6
(Argentina) M Estévez | 3 | 6 | 6
(Australia) G Jones | 6 | 3 | 4

Semifinals
(Chile) J Aguilar | 6^{3} | 6 | 0
(Argentina) M Estévez | 7^{7} | 4 | 6

=== Bottom half ===
First round
8 | (Argentina) F Argüello | 1 | 6 | 6
(Argentina) G Durán | 6 | 1 | 0
(United States) A Collarini | 6 | 7^{7}
Q | (Ecuador) E Gomez | 1 | 6^{5}
(Chile) G Rivera Aránguiz | 6 | 6
WC | (Ecuador) D Hidalgo | 2 | 4
(Brazil) F de Paula | 1 | 3
3 | (Dominican Republic) V Estrella | 6 | 6
7 | (Ecuador) JC Campozano | 6 | 6
(Argentina) D Schwartzman | 3 | 2
(Mexico) D Garza | 6 | 6
(Brazil) R Hocevar | 1 | 4
Q | (United States) G Ouellette | 6 | 6
(Brazil) B Sant'Anna | 3 | 4
(Argentina) R Olivo | 6 | 2 | 5
2 | (Argentina) G Pella | 2 | 6 | 7

Second round
8 | (Argentina) F Argüello | 3 | 6 | 7
(United States) A Collarini | 6 | 0 | 5
(Chile) G Rivera Aránguiz | 2 | 2
3 | (Dominican Republic) V Estrella | 6 | 6
7 | (Ecuador) JC Campozano | 6 | 6
(Mexico) D Garza | 4 | 2
Q | (United States) G Ouellette | 1 | 1
2 | (Argentina) G Pella | 6 | 6

Quarterfinals
8 | (Argentina) F Argüello | 7^{7} | 6
3 | (Dominican Republic) V Estrella | 6^{3} | 2
7 | (Ecuador) JC Campozano | 4 | 6^{3}
2 | (Argentina) G Pella | 6 | 7^{7}

Semifinals
8 | (Argentina) F Argüello | 5 | 3
2 | (Argentina) G Pella | 7 | 6
