= 2013 Manta Open =

- Date: 1–7 July
- Edition: 10th
- Surface: Hard
- Location: Manta, Ecuador

Champions

Singles
- (United States) Michael Russell

Doubles
- (El Salvador) Marcelo Arévalo / (Peru) Sergio Galdós
← 2012 ·	Manta Open	· 2014 →

The 2013 Manta Open is a professional tennis tournament played on clay courts. It was the 10th edition of the tournament which was part of the 2013 ATP Challenger Tour. It took place in Manta, Ecuador between 1 and 7 July 2013.

== Singles main draw entrants ==
=== Seeds ===
Country	Player	Rank^{1}	Seed
USA	Michael Russell	95	1
ARG	Guido Andreozzi	144	2
COL	Alejandro González	164	3
ARG	Facundo Argüello	169	4
BRA	Thiago Alves	202	5
ECU	Julio César Campozano	209	6
CAN	Peter Polansky	213	7
BRA	Fabiano de Paula	238	8

- ^{1} Rankings are as of June 25, 2013.

=== Other entrants ===
The following players received wildcards into the singles main draw:

- (Ecuador) Emilio Gómez
- (Ecuador) Diego Hidalgo
- (Chile) Nicolás Massú
- (Ecuador) Roberto Quiroz

The following players received entry as alternates into the singles main draw:

- (Ecuador) Iván Endara
- (Argentina) Juan Ignacio Londero
- (Colombia) Michael Quintero

The following players received entry from the qualifying draw:

- (Ecuador) Andres Cabezas
- (Peru) Sergio Galdós
- (Colombia) Felipe Mantilla
- (Colombia) Eduardo Struvay

== Champions ==
=== Singles ===
- (United States) Michael Russell def. (Australia) Greg Jones 4–6, 6–0, 7–5

=== Doubles ===
- (El Salvador) Marcelo Arévalo / (Peru) Sergio Galdós def. (Colombia) Alejandro González / (Colombia) Carlos Salamanca 6–3, 6–4
