= 2012 Manta Open =

- Date: 28 July – 5 August
- Edition: 9th
- Surface: Hard
- Location: Manta, Ecuador

Champions

Singles
- (Argentina) Guido Pella

Doubles
- (Peru) Duilio Beretta / (Argentina) Renzo Olivo
← 2011 ·	Manta Open	· 2013 →

The 2012 Manta Open was a professional tennis tournament played on hard courts. It was the ninth edition of the tournament which was part of the 2012 ATP Challenger Tour. It took place in Manta, Ecuador between 28 July and 5 August 2012.

== Singles main-draw entrants ==
=== Seeds ===
Country	Player	Rank^{1}	Seed
BRA	João Souza	126	1
ARG	Guido Pella	184	2
DOM	Víctor Estrella	193	3
ARG	Guido Andreozzi	210	4
ARG	Agustín Velotti	214	5
COL	Carlos Salamanca	220	6
COL	Júlio César Campozano	249	7
ARG	Facundo Argüello	260	8

- ^{1} Rankings are as of July 23, 2012.

=== Other entrants ===
The following players received wildcards into the singles main draw:

- (Ecuador) Galo Barrezueta
- (Ecuador) Diego Hidalgo
- (Ecuador) Roberto Quiroz
- (Brazil) João Souza

The following players received entry from the qualifying draw:

- (Ecuador) Iván Endara
- (Ecuador) Emilio Gómez
- (Japan) Yuichi Ito
- (United States) Greg Ouellette

== Champions ==
=== Singles ===
- (Argentina) Guido Pella def. (Argentina) Maximiliano Estévez, 6–4, 7–5

=== Doubles ===
- (Peru) Duilio Beretta / (Argentina) Renzo Olivo def. (Dominican Republic) Víctor Estrella / (Brazil) João Souza, 6–3, 6–0
