= 2012 Manta Open – Doubles =

Doubles
- 2012 Manta Open

Final
- Champions: (Peru) Duilio Beretta; (Argentina) Renzo Olivo
- Runners-up: (Dominican Republic) Víctor Estrella; (Brazil) João Souza
- Score: 6–3, 6–0

Events
Singles	Doubles
- Manta Open

Brian Dabul and Izak van der Merwe were the defending champions, but chose not to play this year.
Duilio Beretta and Renzo Olivo won the title, defeating Víctor Estrella and João Souza 6–3, 6–0 in the final.

== Seeds ==
1. (Dominican Republic) Víctor Estrella / (Brazil) João Souza (finals)
2. (Argentina) Guido Andreozzi / (Brazil) Fernando Romboli (quarterfinals)
3. (Chile) Jorge Aguilar / (Mexico) Daniel Garza (semifinals)
4. (Peru) Sergio Galdós / (Argentina) Andrés Molteni (quarterfinals)

== Draw ==
Key

- Q = Qualifier
- WC = Wild card
- LL = Lucky loser
- Alt = Alternate
- ITF = ITF entry
- PR = Protected ranking
- SR = Special ranking
- SE = Special exempt
- JE = Junior exempt
- JR = Junior Accelerator Programme entrant
- CO = College Accelerator Programme entrant
- NG = Next Gen Accelerator Program entrant
- w/o = Walkover
- r = Retired
- d = Defaulted

=== Draw ===
First round

Quarterfinals

Semifinals

Final

1
- (Dominican Republic) V Estrella
- (Brazil) J Souza
6
3
[12]

(United States) V Mirzadeh
(United States) M Sykut
1
6
[10]

1
- (Dominican Republic) V Estrella
- (Brazil) J Souza
7^{7}
6

- (Colombia) N Barrientos
- (Colombia) C Salamanca
4
6^{4}

WC
- (Argentina) G Durán
- (Ecuador) I Endara
6^{4}
4

WC
- (Argentina) G Durán
- (Ecuador) I Endara
6
7^{7}

1
- (Dominican Republic) V Estrella
- (Brazil) J Souza
7
7^{7}

3
- (Chile) J Aguilar
- (Mexico) D Garza
6
3
[10]

3
- (Chile) J Aguilar
- (Mexico) D Garza
5
6^{2}

- (United States) A Collarini
- (Argentina) D Schwartzman
2
6
[7]

3
- (Chile) J Aguilar
- (Mexico) D Garza
2
6
[13]

(Australia) G Jones
(United States) G Ouellette
6
6

(Australia) G Jones
(United States) G Ouellette
6
4
[11]

WC
(United States) Sam Barnett
(United States) K Kim
1
4

1
- (Dominican Republic) V Estrella
- (Brazil) J Souza
3
0

WC
- (Ecuador) E Gomez
- (Ecuador) D Hidalgo
2
3

- (Peru) D Beretta
- (Argentina) R Olivo
6
6

- (Brazil) F de Paula
- (Brazil) R Hocevar
6
6

- (Brazil) F de Paula
- (Brazil) R Hocevar
2
6
[12]

- (Argentina) F Argüello
- (Argentina) A Velotti
3
2

4
- (Peru) S Galdós
- (Argentina) A Molteni
6
2
[10]

4
- (Peru) S Galdós
- (Argentina) A Molteni
6
6

- (Brazil) F de Paula
- (Brazil) R Hocevar
2
3

- (Argentina) M Estévez
- (Argentina) G Pella
5
7^{8}
[7]

- (Peru) D Beretta
- (Argentina) R Olivo
6
6

- (Peru) D Beretta
- (Argentina) R Olivo
7
6^{6}
[10]

- (Peru) D Beretta
- (Argentina) R Olivo
3
6
[10]

- (Ecuador) JC Campozano
- (Ecuador) R Quiroz
6
4
[9]

2
- (Argentina) G Andreozzi
- (Brazil) F Romboli
6
3
[4]

2
- (Argentina) G Andreozzi
- (Brazil) F Romboli
1
6
[11]
