= 2010 Manta Open – Trofeo Ricardo Delgado Aray =

- Date: April 26 – May 2
- Edition: 7th
- Location: Manta, Ecuador

Champions

Singles
- (Japan) Go Soeda

Doubles
- (United States) Ryler DeHeart / (Canada) Pierre-Ludovic Duclos
← 2009 ·	Manta Open – Trofeo Ricardo Delgado Aray	· 2011 →

The 2010 Manta Open – Trofeo Ricardo Delgado Aray was a professional tennis tournament played on outdoor hard courts. It was part of the 2010 ATP Challenger Tour. It took place in Manta, Ecuador between April 26 and May 2, 2010.

== ATP entrants ==
=== Seeds ===
Nationality	Player	Ranking*	Seeding
USA	Rajeev Ram	96	1
USA	Kevin Kim	133	2
ARG	Brian Dabul	152	3
AUS	Greg Jones	181	4
JPN	Go Soeda	184	5
BRA	Ricardo Hocevar	189	6
USA	Ryler DeHeart	194	7
ARG	Sebastián Decoud	212	8

- Rankings are as of April 19, 2010.

=== Other entrants ===
The following players received wildcards into the singles main draw:

- (United States) Carlton Fiorentino
- (Ecuador) Diego Acosta
- (Ecuador) Júlio César Campozano
- (Ecuador) Emilio Gómez

The following players received entry from the qualifying draw:

- (Peru) Mauricio Echazú
- (Ecuador) Iván Endara
- (Germany) Sebastian Rieschick
- (Switzerland) Roman Valent

== Champions ==
=== Singles ===
(Japan) Go Soeda def. (United States) Ryler DeHeart, 7–6(5), 6–2

=== Doubles ===
(United States) Ryler DeHeart / (Canada) Pierre-Ludovic Duclos def. (Germany) Martin Emmrich / (Sweden) Andreas Siljeström, 6–4, 7–5
