= 2014 Trofeo Ricardo Delgado Aray – Doubles =

Doubles
- 2014 Trofeo Ricardo Delgado Aray

Final
- Champions: (United States) Chase Buchanan; (Canada) Peter Polansky
- Runners-up: (Venezuela) Luis David Martínez; (Colombia) Eduardo Struvay
- Score: 6–4, 6–4

Events
Singles	Doubles
- Trofeo Ricardo Delgado Aray

These are the ATP Challenger Tour doubles matches for the 2014 Trofeo Ricardo Delgado Aray.

Marcelo Arévalo and Sergio Galdós were the defending champions but Galdós did not participate that year and Arévalo played alongside César Ramírez and lost in the semi-finals to Chase Buchanan and Peter Polansky.

Chase Buchanan and Peter Polansky won the title, defeating Luis David Martínez and Eduardo Struvay in the final, 6–4, 6–4.

== Seeds ==
1. (El Salvador) Marcelo Arévalo / (Mexico) César Ramírez (semifinals)
2. (Argentina) Guido Andreozzi / (Argentina) Facundo Argüello (first round)
3. (United States) Chase Buchanan / (Canada) Peter Polansky (champions)
4. (Venezuela) Luis David Martínez / (Colombia) Eduardo Struvay (final)

== Draw ==
Key

- Q = Qualifier
- WC = Wild card
- LL = Lucky loser
- Alt = Alternate
- ITF = ITF entry
- PR = Protected ranking
- SR = Special ranking
- SE = Special exempt
- JE = Junior exempt
- JR = Junior Accelerator Programme entrant
- CO = College Accelerator Programme entrant
- NG = Next Gen Accelerator Program entrant
- w/o = Walkover
- r = Retired
- d = Defaulted

=== Draw ===
First round

Quarterfinals

Semifinals

Final

1
- (El Salvador) M Arévalo
- (Mexico) C Ramírez
6
7^{7}

- (United States) Amrit Narasimhan
- (United States) M Shabaz
4
6^{2}

1
- (El Salvador) M Arévalo
- (Mexico) C Ramírez
6
6

- (Ecuador) G Escobar
- (Ecuador) D Hidalgo
6
6

- (Ecuador) G Escobar
- (Ecuador) D Hidalgo
2
1

WC
(Ecuador) Gabriel Jacques
(Ecuador) Jorman Reyes
1
1

1
- (El Salvador) M Arévalo
- (Mexico) C Ramírez
5
6^{3}

3
- (United States) C Buchanan
- (Canada) P Polansky
6
6

3
- (United States) C Buchanan
- (Canada) P Polansky
7
7^{7}

WC
(United States) William Conigliaro
(Ecuador) Diego Quiroz
1
0

3
- (United States) C Buchanan
- (Canada) P Polansky
6
6

WC
- (Peru) Conner del Pino
- (Peru) I Miranda
4
6
[10]

WC
- (Peru) C del Pino
- (Peru) I Miranda
3
2

- (Ecuador) JC Campozano
- (Argentina) T Lipovšek Puches
6
4
[7]

3
- (United States) C Buchanan
- (Canada) P Polansky
6
6

(Brazil) Henrique Cunha
(Brazil) T Turini
3
6
[10]

4
- (Venezuela) LD Martínez
- (Colombia) E Struvay
4
4

- (Argentina) A Collarini
- (Argentina) JI Londero
6
3
[2]

(Brazil) H Cunha
(Brazil) T Turini
1
3

- (United States) Sam Barnett
- (United States) J Witten
0
1

4
- (Venezuela) LD Martínez
- (Colombia) E Struvay
6
6

4
- (Venezuela) LD Martínez
- (Colombia) E Struvay
6
6

4
- (Venezuela) LD Martínez
- (Colombia) E Struvay
2
7^{7}
[10]

- (United States) Tyler Hochwalt
- (Peru) JP Varillas
6
6

- (Ecuador) E Gómez
- (Ecuador) R Quiroz
6
6^{5}
[7]

(Colombia) Daniel Riveros
(Croatia) Stefan Merunka
1
4

- (United States) T Hochwalt
- (Peru) JP Varillas
1
3

- (Ecuador) E Gómez
- (Ecuador) R Quiroz
6
6^{4}
[10]

- (Ecuador) E Gómez
- (Ecuador) R Quiroz
6
6

2
- (Argentina) G Andreozzi
- (Argentina) F Argüello
2
7^{7}
[3]
