= 2014 Trofeo Ricardo Delgado Aray – Singles =

Singles
- 2014 Trofeo Ricardo Delgado Aray

Final
- Champion: (France) Adrian Mannarino
- Runner-up: (Argentina) Guido Andreozzi
- Score: 4–6, 6–3, 6–2

Events
Singles	Doubles
- Trofeo Ricardo Delgado Aray

Michael Russell was the defending champion, but did not participate that year.

Adrian Mannarino won the title, defeating Guido Andreozzi in the final, 4–6, 6–3, 6–2.

== Seeds ==
1. (France) Adrian Mannarino (champion)
2. (Argentina) Facundo Bagnis (first round)
3. (Argentina) Facundo Argüello (quarterfinals)
4. (Canada) Peter Polansky (quarterfinals)
5. (Japan) Tatsuma Ito (quarterfinals)
6. (Argentina) Guido Andreozzi (final)
7. (Argentina) Andrea Collarini (first round)
8. (United States) Chase Buchanan (semifinals)

== Draw ==
Key

- Q = Qualifier
- WC = Wild card
- LL = Lucky loser
- Alt = Alternate
- ITF = ITF entry
- PR = Protected ranking
- SR = Special ranking
- SE = Special exempt
- JE = Junior exempt
- JR = Junior Accelerator Programme entrant
- CO = College Accelerator Programme entrant
- NG = Next Gen Accelerator Program entrant
- w/o = Walkover
- r = Retired
- d = Defaulted

=== Finals ===
Semifinals
1/Q	(France) Adrian Mannarino	6	6
8	(United States) Chase Buchanan	3	3
6	(Argentina) Guido Andreozzi	6	6
(Ecuador) Emilio Gómez	4	0

Final
1/Q	(France) Adrian Mannarino	4	6	6
6	(Argentina) Guido Andreozzi	6	3	2

=== Top half ===
First round
1/Q	(France) A Mannarino	2	6	6
(United States) Tyler Hochwalt	6	1	0
(Argentina) T Lipovšek Puches	5	2
Q	(Ecuador) R Quiroz	7	6
WC	(Ecuador) Jorman Reyes	1	5
(Argentina) JI Londero	6	7
(Brazil) T Turini	7^{7}	7^{7}
7	(Argentina) A Collarini	6^{3}	6^{5}
4	(Canada) P Polansky	6	4	7
(United States) M Shabaz	4	6	5
(Ecuador) G Lapentti	6	6
(Chile) G Lama	3	1
Q	(Mexico) C Ramírez	6	6^{3}	4
(Ecuador) JC Campozano	2	7^{7}	6
WC	(United States) Sam Barnett	1	0
8	(United States) C Buchanan	6	6

Second round
1/Q	(France) A Mannarino	3	6	6
Q	(Ecuador) R Quiroz	6	2	3
(Argentina) JI Londero	6	6
(Brazil) T Turini	3	4
4	(Canada) P Polansky	4	6	7
(Ecuador) G Lapentti	6	3	5
(Ecuador) JC Campozano	7	3	6^{2}
8	(United States) C Buchanan	5	6	7^{7}

Quarterfinals
1/Q	(France) A Mannarino	6	6
(Argentina) JI Londero	1	3
4	(Canada) P Polansky	4	6	4
8	(United States) C Buchanan	6	3	6

Semifinals
1/Q	(France) A Mannarino	6	6
8	(United States) C Buchanan	3	3

=== Bottom half ===
First round
6	(Argentina) G Andreozzi	6	7
(Chile) M Sborowitz	1	5
(Brazil) Henrique Cunha	4	7	6
(Venezuela) D Souto	6	5	2
(Croatia) Stefan Merunka	2	2
(Venezuela) LD Martínez	6	6
WC	(United States) William Conigliaro	0	0
3	(Argentina) F Argüello	6	6
5	(Japan) T Ito	6	6
(El Salvador) M Arévalo	2	3
WC	(Ecuador) G Escobar	6	6
(Colombia) E Struvay	4	4
LL	(Colombia) DE Galán	6^{2}	2
(Ecuador) E Gómez	7^{7}	6
(United States) J Witten	6	7^{7}
2/Q	(Argentina) F Bagnis	2	6^{4}

Second round
6	(Argentina) G Andreozzi	6	6
(Brazil) H Cunha	4	2
(Venezuela) LD Martínez	2	4
3	(Argentina) F Argüello	6	6
5	(Japan) T Ito	6^{7}	6	6
WC	(Ecuador) G Escobar	7^{9}	3	4
(Ecuador) E Gómez	6^{3}	6	7^{7}
(United States) J Witten	7^{7}	4	6^{4}

Quarterfinals
6	(Argentina) G Andreozzi	6	6^{6}	6
3	(Argentina) F Argüello	3	7^{8}	4
5	(Japan) T Ito	1	4
(Ecuador) E Gómez	6	6

Semifinals
6	(Argentina) G Andreozzi	6	6
(Ecuador) E Gómez	4	0
