= 2009 Manta Open – Trofeo Ricardo Delgado Aray – Singles =

Trofeo Ricardo Delgado Aray – Singles
- 2009 Manta Open – Trofeo Ricardo Delgado Aray

Final
- Champion: (Argentina) Horacio Zeballos
- Runner-up: (France) Vincent Millot
- Score: 3–6, 7–5, 6–3

Events
| Singles | Doubles |
- Manta Open – Trofeo Ricardo Delgado Aray

Giovanni Lapentti was the title defender, but he retired in the semifinal, when the result was 3–6 for Vincent Millot.
Horacio Zeballos won in the final 3–6, 7–5, 6–3, against Vincent Millot.

== Seeds ==
1. (Argentina) Horacio Zeballos (champion)
2. (Ecuador) Giovanni Lapentti (semifinals, retired)
3. (Brazil) Ricardo Hocevar (semifinals)
4. (Mexico) Santiago González (quarterfinals)
5. (United Kingdom) James Ward (first round)
6. (Dominican Republic) Víctor Estrella (first round)
7. (Venezuela) José de Armas (second round)
8. (Argentina) Mariano Puerta (first round, retired)

== Draw ==
Key

- Q = Qualifier
- WC = Wild card
- LL = Lucky loser
- Alt = Alternate
- ITF = ITF entry
- PR = Protected ranking
- SR = Special ranking
- SE = Special exempt
- JE = Junior exempt
- JR = Junior Accelerator Programme entrant
- CO = College Accelerator Programme entrant
- NG = Next Gen Accelerator Program entrant
- w/o = Walkover
- r = Retired
- d = Defaulted

=== Final four ===
Semifinals
1 | (Argentina) Horacio Zeballos | 6 | 6
3 | (Brazil) Ricardo Hocevar | 4 | 4
(France) Vincent Millot | 6 | 0
2 | (Ecuador) Giovanni Lapentti | 3 | 0^{r}

Final
1 | (Argentina) Horacio Zeballos | 3 | 7 | 6
(France) Vincent Millot | 6 | 5 | 3

=== Top half ===
First round
1 | (Argentina) H Zeballos | 6 | 6
(Italy) L D'Agord | 4 | 2
(Brazil) A Bonatto | 6 | 6
WC | (Ecuador) P Alvarado | 0 | 1
(Japan) T Matsui | 4 | 6^{5}
(Spain) F Vicente | 6 | 7
(Argentina) C Benedetti | 1 | 3
7 | (Venezuela) J de Armas | 6 | 6
3 | (Brazil) R Hocevar | 6 | 6
(United States) C Fiorentino | 4 | 4
(New Zealand) D King-Turner | 6 | 6
(United States) E Nunez | 4 | 2
Q | (Ecuador) G Escobar | 3 | 2
WC | (Argentina) M Zabaleta | 6 | 6
(Ecuador) JC Campozano | 6 | 6
5 | (United Kingdom) J Ward | 3 | 2

Second round
1 | (Argentina) H Zeballos | 7 | 2 | 7
(Brazil) A Bonatto | 6^{1} | 6 | 5
(Spain) F Vicente | 6 | 6
7 | (Venezuela) J de Armas | 4 | 3
3 | (Brazil) R Hocevar | 6 | 6
(New Zealand) D King-Turner | 1 | 1
WC | (Argentina) M Zabaleta | 3 | 6 | 6
(Ecuador) JC Campozano | 6 | 1 | 3

Quarterfinals
1 | (Argentina) H Zeballos | 7 | 6
(Spain) F Vicente | 6^{3} | 4
3 | (Brazil) R Hocevar | 6^{5} | 6 | 6
WC | (Argentina) M Zabaleta | 7 | 2 | 4

Semifinals
1 | (Argentina) H Zeballos | 6 | 6
3 | (Brazil) R Hocevar | 4 | 4

=== Bottom half ===
First round
8 | (Argentina) M Puerta | 1 | 0^{r}
(Colombia) A González | 6 | 0
(Argentina) A Fabbri | 4 | 3
(France) V Millot | 6 | 6
(Denmark) K Pless | 6 | 6
WC | (Argentina) A Apud | 0 | 1
Q | (Ecuador) E Gómez | 4 | 1
4 | (Mexico) S González | 6 | 6
6 | (Dominican Republic) V Estrella | 6 | 1 | 4
Q | (Mexico) B Echagaray | 4 | 6 | 6
(Ecuador) C Avellán | 2 | 4
(Uruguay) M Felder | 6 | 6
(Spain) G Alcaide | 6 | 7
Q | (Argentina) G Pella | 3 | 5
(Brazil) A Miele | 3 | 6 | 3
2 | (Ecuador) G Lapentti | 6 | 4 | 6

Second round
(Colombia) A González | 0 | 1
(France) V Millot | 6 | 6
(Denmark) K Pless | 2 | 2
4 | (Mexico) S González | 6 | 6
Q | (Mexico) B Echagaray | 6 | 6
(Uruguay) M Felder | 4 | 2
(Spain) G Alcaide | 3 | 1
2 | (Ecuador) G Lapentti | 6 | 6

Quarterfinals
(France) V Millot | 6 | 6^{5} | 6
4 | (Mexico) S González | 0 | 7 | 3
Q | (Mexico) B Echagaray | 7 | 3 | 6^{1}
2 | (Ecuador) G Lapentti | 6^{4} | 6 | 7

Semifinals
(France) V Millot | 6 | 0
2 | (Ecuador) G Lapentti | 3 | 0^{r}
