= 2014 Trofeo Ricardo Delgado Aray =

- Date: 30 June – 6 July
- Edition: 11th
- Surface: Hard
- Location: Manta, Ecuador

Champions

Singles
- (France) Adrian Mannarino

Doubles
- (United States) Chase Buchanan / (Canada) Peter Polansky
- Trofeo Ricardo Delgado Aray

The 2014 Manta Open Trofeo Ricardo Delgado Aray was a professional tennis tournament played on clay courts. It was the 11th edition of the tournament which was part of the 2014 ATP Challenger Tour. It took place in Manta, Ecuador between 30 June and 6 July 2014.

== Singles main-draw entrants ==
=== Seeds ===
Country	Player	Rank^{1}	Seed
FRA	Adrian Mannarino	81	1
ARG	Facundo Bagnis	111	2
ARG	Facundo Argüello	115	3
CAN	Peter Polansky	126	4
JPN	Tatsuma Ito	129	5
ARG	Guido Andreozzi	167	6
ARG	Andrea Collarini	192	7
USA	Chase Buchanan	197	8

- ^{1} Rankings are as of June 24, 2014.

=== Other entrants ===
The following players received wildcards into the singles main draw:

- (Ecuador) Jorman Reyes
- (United States) Sam Barnett
- (Ecuador) William Conigliaro
- (Ecuador) Gonzalo Escobar

The following players received entry from the qualifying draw:

- (France) Adrian Mannarino
- (Argentina) Facundo Bagnis
- (Mexico) César Ramírez
- (Ecuador) Roberto Quiroz

== Champions ==
=== Singles ===
ATP Challenger Tour singles matches for the 2014 Trofeo Ricardo Delgado Aray.

- (France) Adrian Mannarino def. (Argentina) Guido Andreozzi, 4–6, 6–3, 6–2

=== Doubles ===
ATP Challenger Tour doubles matches for the 2014 Trofeo Ricardo Delgado Aray.

- (United States) Chase Buchanan / (Canada) Peter Polansky def. (Venezuela) Luis David Martínez / (Colombia) Eduardo Struvay, 6–4, 6–4
