= 2009 Manta Open – Trofeo Ricardo Delgado Aray =

- Date: July 20–26
- Edition: 6th
- Location: Manta, Ecuador

Champions

Singles
- (Argentina) Horacio Zeballos

Doubles
- (Brazil) Ricardo Hocevar / (Brazil) André Miele
← 2008 ·	Manta Open – Trofeo Ricardo Delgado Aray	· 2010 →

The 2009 Manta Open – Trofeo Ricardo Delgado Aray was a professional tennis tournament played on outdoor hard courts. It was part of the 2009 ATP Challenger Tour. It took place in Manta, Ecuador between 20 and 26 July 2009.

== Singles entrants ==
=== Seeds ===
Nationality	Player	Ranking*	Seeding
ARG	Horacio Zeballos	131	1
ECU	Giovanni Lapentti	164	2
BRA	Ricardo Hocevar	200	3
MEX	Santiago González	204	4
GBR	James Ward	206	5
DOM	Víctor Estrella	227	6
VEN	José de Armas	255	7
ARG	Mariano Puerta	276	8

- Rankings are as of July 13, 2009.

=== Other entrants ===
The following players received wildcards into the singles main draw:

- (Ecuador) Patricio Alvarado
- (Argentina) Alejo Apud
- (Argentina) Mariano Zabaleta

The following players received entry from the qualifying draw:

- (Mexico) Bruno Echagaray
- (Ecuador) Gonzalo Escobar
- (Ecuador) Emilio Gómez
- (Argentina) Guido Pella

== Champions ==
=== Singles ===
(Argentina) Horacio Zeballos def. (France) Vincent Millot, 3–6, 7–5, 6–3

=== Doubles ===
(Brazil) Ricardo Hocevar / (Brazil) André Miele def. (Mexico) Santiago González / (Argentina) Horacio Zeballos, 6–1, 2–6, [10–7]
