= 2011 Manta Open =

- Date: 18–24 July
- Edition: 8th
- Location: Manta, Ecuador

Champions

Singles
- (Argentina) Brian Dabul

Doubles
- (Argentina) Brian Dabul / (South Africa) Izak van der Merwe
← 2010 ·	Manta Open	· 2012 →

The 2011 Manta Open was a professional tennis tournament played on hard courts. It was the eighth edition of the tournament which was part of the 2011 ATP Challenger Tour. It took place in Manta, Ecuador between 18 and 24 July 2011.

== Singles main-draw entrants ==
=== Seeds ===
Country	Player	Rank^{1}	Seed
RSA	Izak van der Merwe	123	1
BRA	Rogério Dutra da Silva	134	2
COL	Carlos Salamanca	175	3
ARG	Brian Dabul	209	4
DOM	Víctor Estrella	212	5
ARG	Sebastián Decoud	216	6
BRA	Fernando Romboli	242	7
ARG	Facundo Argüello	260	8

- ^{1} Rankings are as of July 11, 2011.

=== Other entrants ===
The following players received wildcards into the singles main draw:

- (Ecuador) Galo Barrezueta
- (United States) Joseph Correa
- (Ecuador) Diego Hidalgo
- (Ecuador) Roberto Quiroz

The following players received entry from the qualifying draw:

- (Colombia) Nicolás Barrientos
- (Ecuador) Iván Endara
- (Ecuador) Emilio Gómez
- (Colombia) Juan Sebastián Gómez

== Champions ==
=== Singles ===
(Argentina) Brian Dabul def. (Argentina) Facundo Argüello, 6–1, 6–3

=== Doubles ===
(Argentina) Brian Dabul / (South Africa) Izak van der Merwe def. (United States) John Paul Fruttero / (South Africa) Raven Klaasen, 6–1, 6–7^{(7–2)}, [11–9]
