= Vincent Millot =

French tennis player

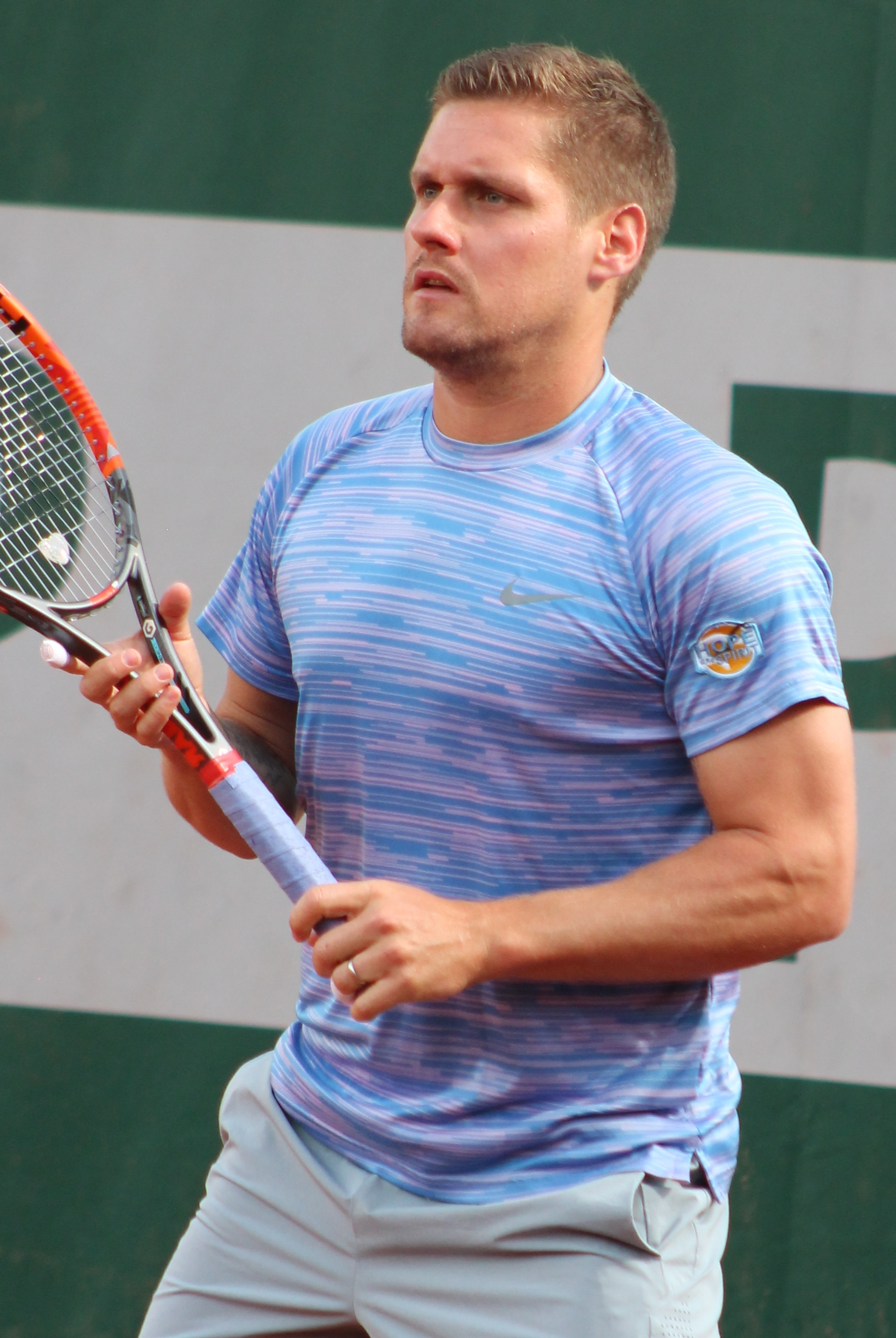
- Country (sports): France
- Residence: Dijon, France
- Born: 30 January 1986 (age 40) Montpellier, France
- Height: 1.63 m (5 ft 4 in)
- Turned pro: 2007
- Plays: Left-handed (two-handed backhand)
- Coach: Daniel Meyers
- Prize money: $948,035

Singles
- Career record: 8–22
- Career titles: 0
- Highest ranking: No. 135 (10 October 2016)

Grand Slam singles results
- Australian Open: 2R (2014)
- French Open: 1R (2011)
- Wimbledon: 1R (2015)
- US Open: 1R (2017)

Doubles
- Career record: 2–4
- Career titles: 0
- Highest ranking: No. 490 (8 May 2017)

Grand Slam doubles results
- French Open: 2R (2016)

Other doubles tournaments

Grand Slam mixed doubles results
- French Open: 1R (2016, 2017)
- Last updated on: 6 February 2023.

Vincent Millot (French pronunciation: [vɛ̃sɑ̃ mijo]; born 30 January 1986, in Montpellier, France) is a French former professional tennis player. Despite never having reached the top 100, Millot has played at each of the four Grand Slam events.

== ATP Challenger and ITF Futures finals ==
=== Singles: 24 (6–18) ===
Legend ATP Challenger (2–8) ITF Futures (4–10)	Finals by surface Hard (6–12) Clay (0–5) Grass (0–1) Carpet (0–0)

Result	W–L	Date	Tournament	Tier	Surface	Opponent	Score
Loss	0–1	Aug 2006	Italy F25, Imperia	Futures	Clay	(Italy) Matteo Viola	3–6, 6–1, 0–6
Loss	0–2	Sep 2006	Switzerland F5, Pully	Futures	Clay	(France) Alexandre Renard	3–6, 6–3, 3–6
Loss	0–3	Mar 2007	Canada F2, Montreal	Futures	Hard	(Canada) Frédéric Niemeyer	3–6, 4–6
Loss	0–4	Jul 2007	France F11, Saint-Gervais	Futures	Clay	(France) Éric Prodon	2–6, 2–6
Loss	0–5	Oct 2007	France F16, Nevers	Futures	Hard	(Switzerland) Stéphane Bohli	2–6, 1–6
Loss	0–6	Oct 2008	France F17, Nevers	Futures	Hard	(France) Stéphane Robert	4–6, 1–6
Loss	0–7	Oct 2008	France F18, Saint-Dizier	Futures	Hard	(Belgium) Niels Desein	7–6^{(7–1)}, 3–6, 1–6
Loss	0–8	Feb 2009	France F3, Bressuire	Futures	Hard	(Belgium) Ruben Bemelmans	4–6, 3–6
Win	1–8	Mar 2009	Canada F3, Gatineau	Futures	Hard	(United States) Todd Paul	6–2, 6–4
Loss	1–9	Jun 2009	Netherlands F1, Apeldoorn	Futures	Clay	(Netherlands) Thomas Schoorel	5–7, 6–4, 5–7
Loss	1–10	Jun 2009	Milan, Italy	Challenger	Clay	(Italy) Alessio di Mauro	4–6, 6–7^{(3–7)}
Loss	1–11	Jul 2009	Manta, Ecuador	Challenger	Hard	(Argentina) Horacio Zeballos	6–3, 5–7, 3–6
Win	2–11	Jan 2011	Nouméa, New Caledonia	Challenger	Hard	(Luxembourg) Gilles Müller	7–6^{(8–6)}, 2–6, 6–4
Win	3–11	Feb 2012	China F3, Mengzi	Futures	Hard	(Netherlands) Boy Westerhof	7–6^{(7–3)}, 5–7, 6–1
Win	4–11	Feb 2012	China F4, Yuxi	Futures	Hard	(Slovakia) Norbert Gombos	7–5, 6–4
Loss	4–12	Mar 2012	Canada F1, Gatineau	Futures	Hard	(Germany) Stefan Seifert	6–7^{(7–9)}, 2–6
Loss	4–13	Mar 2013	Cherbourg, France	Challenger	Hard	(Netherlands) Jesse Huta Galung	1–6, 3–6
Win	5–13	Oct 2013	France F18, Nevers	Futures	Hard	(France) Tristan Lamasine	6–3, 6–1
Loss	5–14	Feb 2014	Quimper, France	Challenger	Hard	(France) Pierre-Hugues Herbert	6–7^{(5–7)}, 3–6
Loss	5–15	Sep 2014	St. Remy, France	Challenger	Hard	(France) Nicolas Mahut	7–6^{(7–3)}, 4–6, 3–6
Win	6–15	Jul 2015	Granby, Canada	Challenger	Hard	(Canada) Philip Bester	6–4, 6–4
Loss	6–16	Jun 2016	Ilkley, United Kingdom	Challenger	Grass	(Chinese Taipei) Yen-Hsun Lu	6–7^{(4–7)}, 2–6
Loss	6–17	Aug 2016	Gatineau, Canada	Challenger	Hard	(Canada) Peter Polansky	6–3, 4–6, ret.
Loss	6–18	Oct 2016	Mons, Belgium	Challenger	Hard	(Germany) Jan-Lennard Struff	2–6, 0–6

=== Doubles: 3 (1–2) ===
Legend ATP Challenger (0–1) ITF Futures (1–1)	Finals by surface Hard (1–2) Clay (0–0) Grass (0–0) Carpet (0–0)

Result	W–L	Date	Tournament	Tier	Surface	Partner	Opponents	Score
Win	1–0	Oct 2008	France F17, Nevers	Futures	Hard	(France) Pierrick Ysern	(France) Alexandre Renard (France) Stéphane Robert	6–2, 6–4
Loss	1–1	Oct 2012	France F19, Nevers	Futures	Hard	(France) Constantin Belot	(France) Yannick Jankovits (France) Alexandre Sidorenko	2–6, 2–6
Loss	1–2	Jul 2017	Gatineau, Canada	Challenger	Hard	(Mexico) Hans Hach	(United States) Bradley Klahn (United States) Jackson Withrow	2–6, 3–6

== Performance timeline ==
Key
W	F	SF	QF	#R	RR	Q#	P#	DNQ	A	Z#	PO	G	S	B	NMS	NTI	P	NH

(W) winner; (F) finalist; (SF) semifinalist; (QF) quarterfinalist; (#R) rounds 4, 3, 2, 1; (RR) round-robin stage; (Q#) qualification round; (P#) preliminary round; (DNQ) did not qualify; (A) absent; (Z#) Davis/Fed Cup Zonal Group (with number indication) or (PO) play-off; (G) gold, (S) silver or (B) bronze Olympic/Paralympic medal; (NMS) not a Masters tournament; (NTI) not a Tier I tournament; (P) postponed; (NH) not held; (SR) strike rate (events won / competed); (W–L) win–loss record.

=== Singles ===
Tournament	2009	2010	2011	2012	2013	2014	2015	2016	2017	2018	SR	W–L	Win%
Grand Slam tournaments
Australian Open	A	Q1	1R	A	Q1	2R	Q3	Q3	Q2	Q1	0 / 2	1–2	33%
French Open	A	Q1	1R	Q2	Q3	Q1	Q2	Q2	Q2	A	0 / 1	0–1	0%
Wimbledon	A	A	Q1	Q1	Q1	Q2	1R	Q2	Q3	A	0 / 1	0–1	0%
US Open	Q1	Q1	Q2	Q2	A	Q2	Q2	Q2	1R	A	0 / 1	0–1	0%
Win–loss	0–0	0–0	0–2	0–0	0–0	1–1	0–1	0–0	0–1	0–0	0 / 5	1–5	17%
ATP Tour Masters 1000
Indian Wells	A	Q2	A	A	A	A	A	2R	Q1	Q2	0 / 1	1–1	50%
Miami	A	A	A	A	A	A	A	Q1	Q1	A	0 / 0	0–0	–
Monte Carlo	A	A	1R	A	A	A	A	A	A	A	0 / 1	0–1	0%
Canada	Q1	A	A	A	A	Q2	A	Q1	1R	A	0 / 1	0–1	0%
Paris	1R	Q1	A	A	A	Q1	A	Q1	A	A	0 / 1	0–1	0%
Win–loss	0–1	0–0	0–1	0–0	0–0	0–0	0–0	1–1	0–1	0–0	0 / 4	1–4	20%
