= Chase Buchanan =

American tennis player

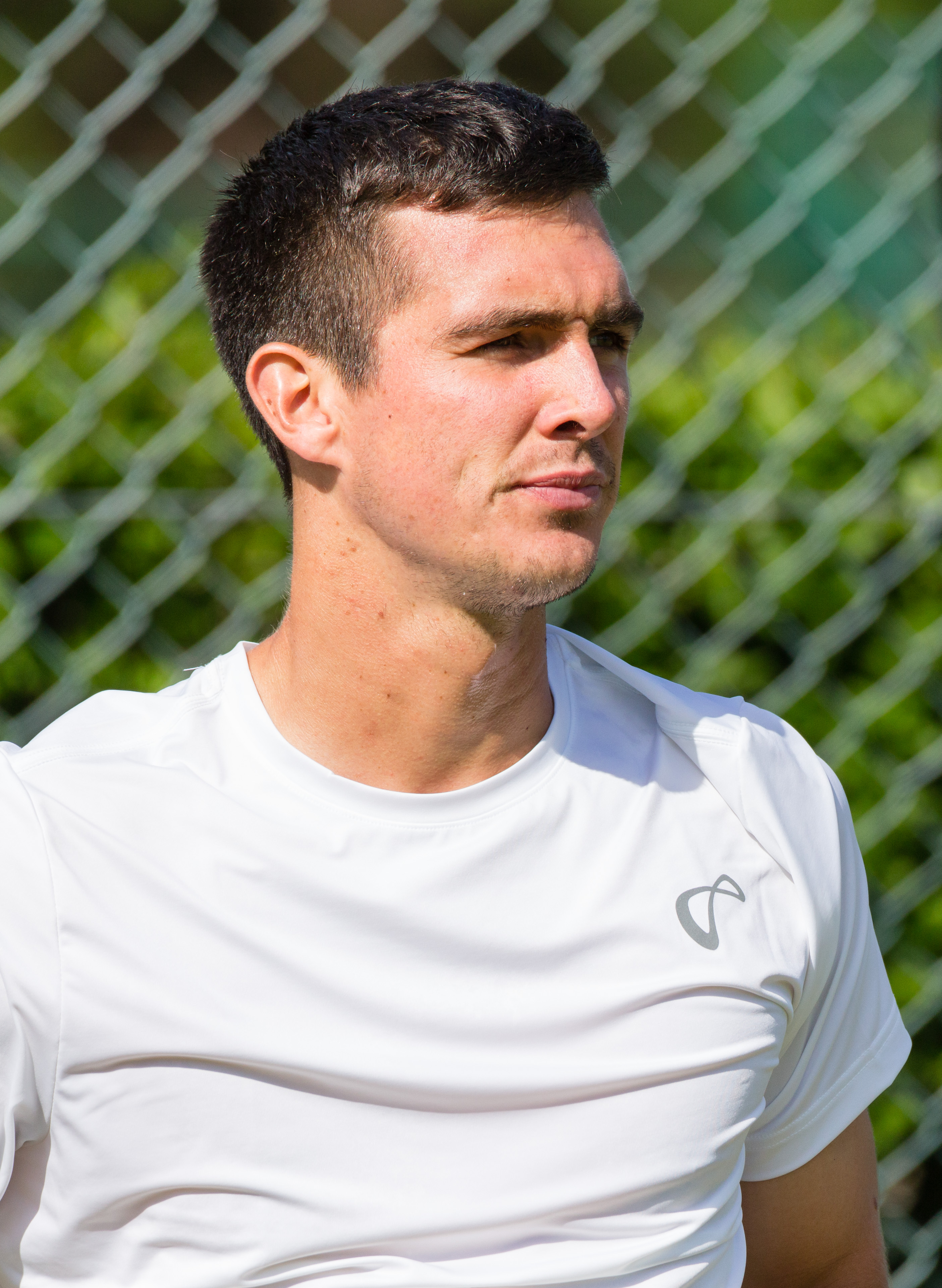
- Buchanan at the 2015 Wimbledon qualifying tournament
- Country (sports): United States
- Residence: Columbus, Ohio, U.S.
- Born: June 4, 1991 (age 34) Columbus, Ohio, U.S.
- Height: 6 ft 4 in (1.93 m)
- Plays: Right-handed (two-handed backhand)
- Prize money: $216,155

Singles
- Career record: 0–2
- Career titles: 0
- Highest ranking: No. 158 (18 August 2014)

Grand Slam singles results
- Australian Open: Q3 (2015)
- French Open: Q1 (2015)
- Wimbledon: Q1 (2014, 2015)
- US Open: 1R (2009)

Doubles
- Career record: 0–3
- Career titles: 0
- Highest ranking: No. 151 (9 November 2015)

Grand Slam doubles results
- US Open: 1R (2008, 2012, 2014)

Chase Buchanan (born June 4, 1991) is an inactive American male tennis player. Buchanan grew up and attended grade school and high school in New Albany, Ohio and attended Ohio State University as a member of the tennis team.

== Career ==
Buchanan reached no. 6 on the junior rankings on March 9, 2009. His first title came at age 15 on the junior tour. He emerged victorious at the Panama Bowl in both singles, emerging from the qualifying to do so; and doubles, alongside fellow 2009 U.S. Open wildcard Devin Britton. He won the 2008 Easter Bowl, beating Alex Llompart in the final. In 2008 and 2009, Buchanan was rated no. 1 in the United States by both TennisRecruiting and Tennis RPI.

In 2009, Buchanan won the USTA Boys 18s National Championship in Kalamazoo, Michigan. Buchanan competed in the 2009 US Open as a wildcard in the men's singles draw. He fell there to Jo-Wilfried Tsonga. He reached the junior singles final of the U.S. Open the same year, falling to Bernard Tomic in the final. His highest ATP ranking was no. 158 in singles.

== Doubles performance timeline ==
Key
W	F	SF	QF	#R	RR	Q#	DNQ	A	NH

(W) winner; (F) finalist; (SF) semifinalist; (QF) quarterfinalist; (#R) rounds 4, 3, 2, 1; (RR) round-robin stage; (Q#) qualification round; (DNQ) did not qualify; (A) absent; (NH) not held; (SR) strike rate (events won / competed); (W–L) win–loss record.

This table is current through 2012 US Open.

Tournament	2008	2009	2010	2011	2012	2013	2014
Grand Slam tournaments
Australian Open							
French Open							
Wimbledon							
US Open	1R				1R		1R
Win–loss	0–1	0–0	0–0	0–0	0–1	0–0	0–1
