= Duilio Beretta =

Peruvian tennis player

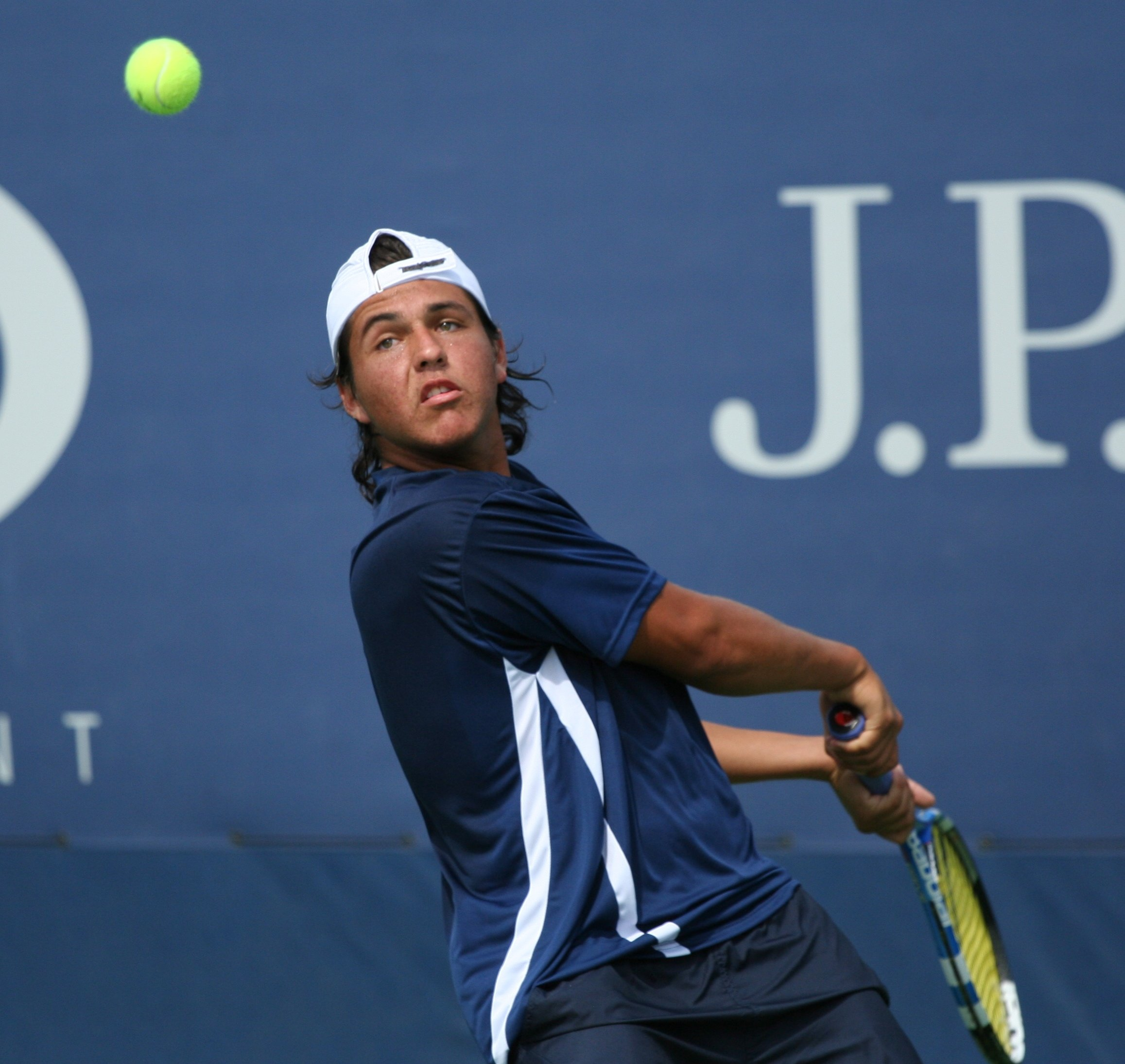
- Country (sports): Peru
- Residence: Lima, Peru
- Born: 25 February 1992 (age 34) Arequipa, Peru
- Turned pro: 2008
- Plays: Right-handed (double-handed backhand)
- Prize money: $51,966

Singles
- Career record: 8–9
- Career titles: 0
- Highest ranking: No. 364 (7 November 2011)

Grand Slam singles results
- French Open Junior: SF (2010)
- Wimbledon Junior: 1R (2010)
- US Open Junior: 2R (2010)

Doubles
- Career record: 6–3
- Career titles: 0
- Highest ranking: No. 206 (29 July 2013)

Grand Slam doubles results
- French Open Junior: W (2010)
- Wimbledon Junior: 2R (2010)
- US Open Junior: W (2010)
Medal record
Representing Peru
Men's tennis
Bolivarian Games
Silver medal – second place	2013 Trujillo	Men's Nations Cup
Bronze medal – third place	2013 Trujillo	Men's doubles
- Last updated on: 15 March 2021.

Duilio Beretta Avalos (Spanish pronunciation: [ˈdwiljo βeˈɾeta aˈβalos]; (Note: In isolation, Beretta is pronounced [beˈɾeta].) born 25 February 1992) is a Peruvian professional tennis player.

He won the finals stage of Boys' Doubles events on the French Open and US Open with Ecuadorian tennis player Roberto Quiroz in 2010. They defeated the Argentinian pair Facundo Argüello and Agustín Velotti in France and won against Oliver Golding and Jiří Veselý in the United States.

== ATP Challenger and ITF Futures finals ==
=== Singles: 8 (2–6) ===
Legend (singles) ATP Challenger Tour (0–0) ITF Futures Tour (2–6)	Finals by surface Hard (0–0) Clay (2–6) Grass (0–0)

Result	W–L	Date	Tournament	Tier	Surface	Opponent	Score
Loss	0–1	Apr 2011	Chile F2	Futures	Clay	(France) Guillaume Rufin	2–6, 2–6
Loss	0–2	May 2011	Venezuela F3	Futures	Clay	(Venezuela) David Souto	2–6, 3–6
Win	1–2	May 2011	Paraguay F2	Futures	Clay	(Argentina) Marco Trungelliti	4–6, 7–6^{(7–2)}, 6–3
Loss	1–3	Jun 2011	Argentine F8	Futures	Clay	(Argentina) Facundo Argüello	6–3, 2–6, 6–7^{(4–7)}
Loss	1–4	Aug 2011	Peru F1	Futures	Clay	(Argentina) Maximiliano Estévez	6–7^{(2–7)}, 6–7^{(3–7)}
Loss	1–5	Aug 2011	Peru F3	Futures	Clay	(Argentina) Agustín Velotti	2–6, 4–6
Loss	1–6	Jun 2012	Peru F1	Futures	Clay	(Argentina) Renzo Olivo	5–7, 6–3, 1–6
Win	2–6	Jun 2012	Peru F6	Futures	Clay	(Chile) Jorge Aguilar	5–7, 6–3, 7–5

=== Doubles: 26 (18–8) ===
Legend (doubles) ATP Challenger Tour (1–2) ITF Futures Tour (17–6)	Finals by surface Hard (2–1) Clay (16–7) Grass (0–0)

Result	W–L	Date	Tournament	Tier	Surface	Partner	Opponents	Score
Loss	0–1	Nov 2009	Chile F5, Santiago	Futures	Clay	(Peru) Sergio Galdós	(Bolivia) Federico Zeballos	4–6, 4–6
Win	1–1	Sep 2010	Ecuador F2, Guayaquil	Futures	Hard	(Ecuador) Roberto Quiroz	(United States) Christopher Racz	6–4, 6–4
Win	2–1	Apr 2011	Chile F2, Santiago	Futures	Clay	(Peru) Sergio Galdós	(Chile) Guillermo Hormazábal | (Chile) Rodrigo Pérez	5–7, 7–6^{(7–5)}, [10–5]
Win	3–1	Apr 2011	Chile F3, Santiago	Futures	Clay	(Ecuador) Roberto Quiroz	(Venezuela) Luis David Martínez | (Mexico) Miguel Ángel Reyes-Varela	6–4, 7–5
Win	4–1	Aug 2011	Peru F1, Arequipa	Futures	Clay	(Peru) Sergio Galdós	(Uruguay) Martín Cuevas | (Argentina) Guido Pella	6–4, 6–0
Loss	4–2	May 2012	Peru F1, Chosica	Futures	Clay	(Peru) Sergio Galdós	(Brazil) Marcelo Demoliner | (Argentina) Renzo Olivo	3–6, 6–7^{(8–10)}
Loss	4–3	Jul 2012	Peru F6, Lima	Futures	Clay	(Peru) Sergio Galdós	(Brazil) Marcelo Demoliner | (Argentina) Renzo Olivo	4–6, 3–6
Win	5–3	Aug 2012	Manta, Ecuador	Challenger	Hard	(Argentina) Renzo Olivo	(Dominican Republic) Víctor Estrella (Brazil) João Souza	6–3, 6–0
Win	6–3	Aug 2012	Colombia F2, Medellín	Futures	Clay	(Uruguay) Ariel Behar	(Colombia) Nicolás Barrientos | (Colombia) Michael Quintero	2–1 ret.
Win	7–3	Sep 2012	Ecuador F3, Quito	Futures	Clay	(Peru) Sergio Galdós	(Peru) Mauricio Echazú | (Chile) Guillermo Rivera Aránguiz	6–2, 6–1
Win	8–3	Oct 2012	Chile F8, Coquimbo	Futures	Clay	(Argentina) Gustavo Sterin	(Chile) Cristóbal Saavedra Corvalán | (Chile) Guillermo Rivera Aránguiz	6–4, 7–5
Loss	8–4	May 2013	Argentina F4, Calamuchita	Futures	Clay	(Peru) Sergio Galdós	(Argentina) Mauricio Perez Mota	1–6, 1–6
Win	9–4	May 2013	Argentina F6, Río Cuarto	Futures	Clay	(Peru) Sergio Galdós	(Argentina) Franco Agamenone | (Argentina) Jose Angel Carrizo	4–6, 6–4, [10–1]
Loss	9–5	May 2013	Argentina F7, Bell Ville	Futures	Clay	(Peru) Sergio Galdós	(Argentina) Andrea Collarini | (Argentina) Guillermo Durán	3–6, 4–6
Win	10–5	Jun 2013	Argentina F8, Arroyito	Futures	Clay	(Peru) Sergio Galdós	(Brazil) Daniel Dutra da Silva | (Argentina) Pablo Galdón	6–0, 7–5
Win	11–5	Aug 2013	Ecuador F1, Guayaquil	Futures	Clay	(Ecuador) Roberto Quiroz	(Peru) Rodrigo Sánchez	6–1, 6–3
Loss	11–6	Aug 2013	Ecuador F2, Guayaquil	Futures	Hard	(Peru) Nicolas Alvarez	(Ecuador) Emilio Gómez | (Ecuador) Roberto Quiroz	1–6, 4–6
Win	12–6	Oct 2013	Peru F1, Arequipa	Futures	Clay	(Peru) Rodrigo Sánchez	(Peru) Mauricio Echazú | (Ecuador) Iván Endara	6–2, 6–4
Win	13–6	Oct 2013	Peru F2, Lima	Futures	Clay	(Peru) Rodrigo Sánchez	(Peru) Mauricio Echazú | (Chile) Cristóbal Saavedra Corvalán	6–3, 5–7, [10–2]
Loss	13–7	Sep 2014	Quito, Ecuador	Challenger	Clay	(Uruguay) Martín Cuevas	(Brazil) Marcelo Demoliner (Brazil) João Souza	4–6, 4–6
Win	14–7	Dec 2014	Dominican Republic F2	Futures	Clay	(Bolivia) Hugo Dellien	(Brazil) Fabiano de Paula | (Brazil) Thiago Monteiro	3–6, 6–4, [10–8]
Win	15–7	Dec 2014	Dominican Republic F3	Futures	Clay	(Bolivia) Hugo Dellien	(Ecuador) Emilio Gómez | (Mexico) Manuel Sánchez	6–7^{(9–11)}, 6–4, [10–4]
Win	16–7	Apr 2015	Chile F4, Santiago	Futures	Clay	(Chile) Jorge Aguilar	(Brazil) André Miele | (Brazil) Alexandre Tsuchiya	6–1, 6–4
Win	17–7	Apr 2015	Chile F5, Santiago	Futures	Clay	(Chile) Jorge Aguilar	(Argentina) Juan Pablo Ficovich | (Argentina) Mariano Kestelboim	6–2, 6–2
Loss	17–8	Sep 2015	Barranquilla, Colombia	Challenger	Clay	(Peru) Mauricio Echazú	(El Salvador) Marcelo Arévalo (Peru) Sergio Galdós	1–6, 4–6
Win	18–8	Dec 2015	Peru F6, Trujillo	Futures	Clay	(Argentina) Andrea Collarini	(Peru) Alexander Merino | (Spain) Jaume Pla Malfeito	6–4, 6–3

== Junior Grand Slam finals ==
=== Doubles: 2 (2 titles) ===
Result	Year	Tournament	Surface	Partner	Opponents	Score
Win	2010	French Open	Clay	(Ecuador) Roberto Quiroz	(Argentina) Facundo Argüello (Argentina) Agustín Velotti	6–3, 6–2
Win	2010	US Open	Hard	(Ecuador) Roberto Quiroz	(United Kingdom) Oliver Golding (Czech Republic) Jiří Veselý	6–1, 7–5

== Evolution in the ATP ranking (singles) ==
Changes in the ranking ATP to the end of the season.

Year	2008	2009	2010	2011	2012
Singles ranking	1480	▲943	▲811	▲392	▼394

== Evolution in the ATP ranking (doubles) ==
Changes in the ranking ATP to the end of the season.

Year	2009	2010	2011	2012
Doubles ranking	1256	▲944	▲473	▲240
