= Manta, Ecuador =

Manta
- City
- San Pablo de Manta
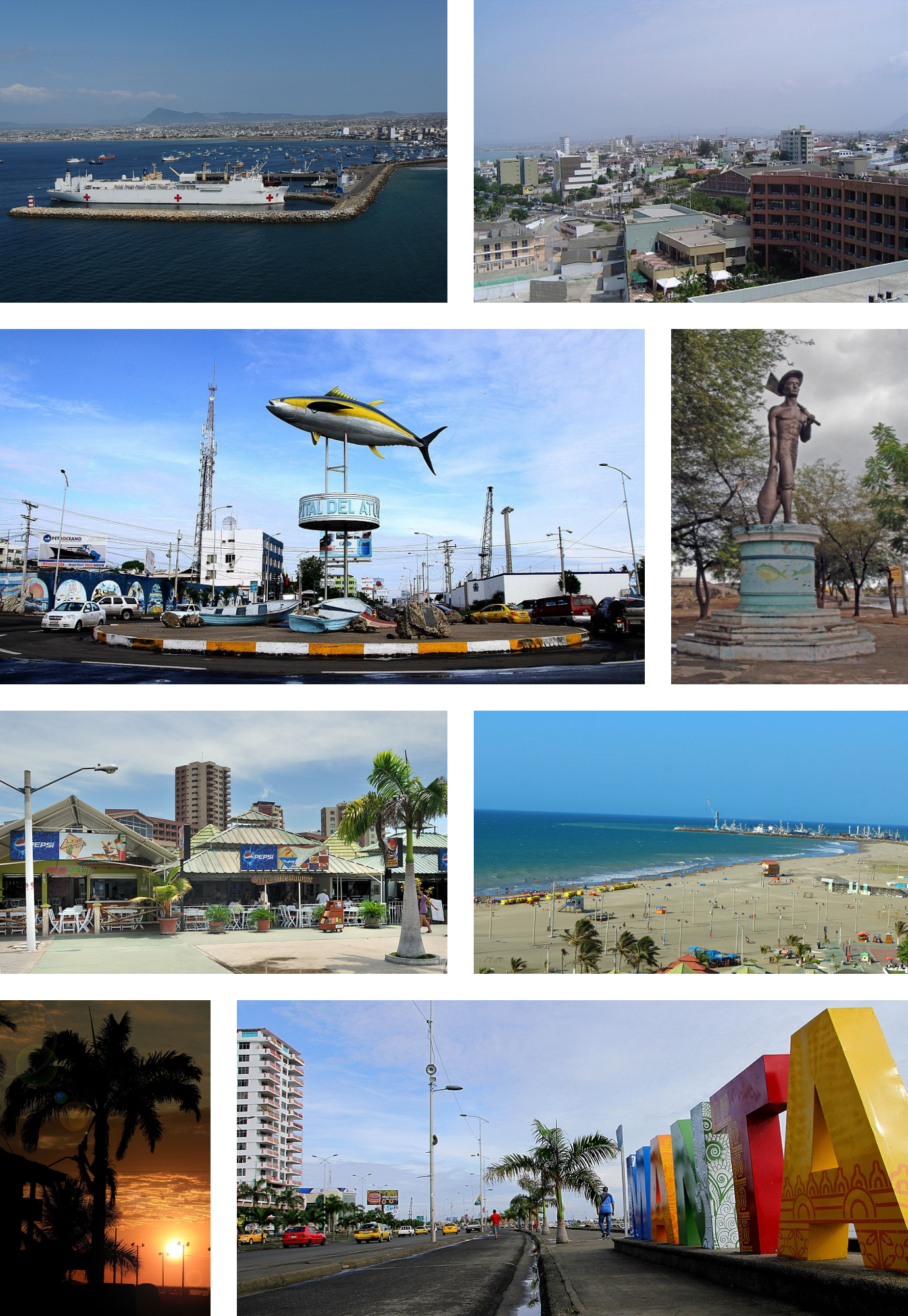
- From top, left to right: View of the seaport, panoramic view of the city, monument to the Tuna, monument to the Fisherman, restaurants on the Scenic Boardwalk, The Bat beach, sunset on the beach and Malecón avenue.
- Nickname: Primer Puerto Marítimo del Ecuador (Ecuador's First Seaport)
- Motto(s): Capital Mundial del Atún y Ciudad de la Pesca, del Atún y del Puerto Turístico, Marítimo y Pesquero (World Capital of Tuna Fishing, Tuna Touristic Port, Maritime and Fisheries)
- Location within Ecuador
- Coordinates: 00°57′00.08″S 80°42′58.32″W
- Country: Ecuador
- Province: Manabí
- Canton: Manta

Government
  - Mayor: Marciana Valdivieso
  - Vice Mayor: Víctor Chávez

Area
  - City: 53.51 km^{2} (20.66 sq mi)
- Elevation: 6 m (20 ft)

Population (2022 census)
  - City: 258,697
  - Rank: 5th in Ecuador
  - Density: 4,835/km^{2} (12,520/sq mi)
- Time zone: UTC-5 (ECT)
- Postal code: EC1308
- Area code: (+593) 5
- Climate: BWh
- Website: www.manta.gob.ec (in Spanish)

Manta, also known as San Pablo de Manta, is a city in Ecuador, cantonal head of the Manta Canton, as well as the largest and most populated city in the Manabí Province. It is the seventh most populous in the country. Manta has existed since Pre-Columbian times. It was a trading post for the Manta, also known as Manteños.

According to the 2022 census, the city had a population of 258,697. In the 21st century, its main economic activity is tuna fishing. Other economic activities include tourism and a chemical industry, with products ranging from cleaning supplies to oils and margarine.

Located on the Pacific coast, Manta has the largest seaport in Ecuador. The port was used by Charles Marie de La Condamine upon his arrival in Ecuador in 1735 when leading the French mission to measure the location of the equator. From Manta, Condamine started his trip inland towards Quito.

Manta has an international airport, Eloy Alfaro International Airport, with passenger airline service, and an important military base (known as Manta Air Base or Eloy Alfaro Air Base). Between 1999-2009 Manta Air Base was used by U.S. air forces to support anti-narcotics military operations and surveillance flights against Colombian drug trafficking cartels. The lease was not renewed by the Ecuadorian government.

Manta is recognized for its international film festival, featuring groups from different places in the world. The Ecuadorian actor Carlos Valencia was invited to Cannes Film Festival for his performance in Ratas Ratones y Rateros (1999), directed by Sebastián Cordero. The latter was born in the capital city of Quito.

== Sport ==
Sporting events take place in November, and from January through April. Football is the main sport of the city, as it is in the nation. The city has two professional teams: Delfín S.C. and Manta F.C. Other teams have included Green Cross F.C., America, Juventud Italiana, and River Plate.

Other sports in Manta include surfing (Manta was the host for the 2004 Bodyboarding World Cup), scuba diving, water skiing, and kitesurfing. Nearby Salinas was the site of the ISA World Junior Surfing Games Ecuador in 2009. Manta hosted the sixth South American Windsurfing Championship.

Manta has underwater diving and sport fishing.

Tennis is also played in Manta. A number of ATP Challenger Series have been played in the city.

== Entertainment and culture ==
Manta hosts an International Theater Festival in September. A MAAC cine, one of four in Ecuador, shows independent and non-Hollywood productions.

The Central Bank Museum includes an important collection of Pre-Columbian craft.

== Economy ==
Manta has one of the larger economies in Ecuador. The main industries are fishing and tuna canning and processing. Processed tuna is exported to Europe and the U.S. International tuna corporations including Bumble Bee, Van Camps, British Columbia Packers, and Conservas Isabel, as well as leading national tuna processor Marbelize, have sizable factories in Manta.

Other important products include vegetable oil. Large Ecuadorian corporations, including La Fabril and Ales, have their main factories in Manta.

According to a recent survey by Vistazo magazine, many of the largest companies by revenue in Ecuador are located in the Manta metropolitan area. It is third after Quito and Guayaquil, which both are home to larger companies.

Tourism is increasingly important for Manta's economy. Various cruise ships have made Manta a port of call while traveling the southern Pacific Ocean. Manta is increasingly an attractive location for foreign retirees and real estate investors, with as many as 7 in 10 real estate clients in the city being foreign investors.

In addition, the original and official "Panama" hats are produced in Manabí. Internationally known, they are made in the nearby town of Montecristi. Montecristi hats are popular souvenirs for many visitors to Manta.

== Tourism ==
Manta receives numerous visits from foreign as well as local tourists. The most visited beaches include "El Murciélago", "Santa Marianita", "San Lorenzo" and "Barbasquillo". Surfers often travel to San Lorenzo to find powerful waves, which are regularly head high.

Kitesurfing has recently become very popular in Santa Marianita (Playa Bonita) because of the excellent wind conditions and long beach.

Nearby is the small town of Montecristi, founded in the early 17th century. It has colonial architecture but is best known for its wickerwork weaving. It is also the original birthplace of Panama hats; despite their name, they were historically produced in Ecuador.

== Gallery ==
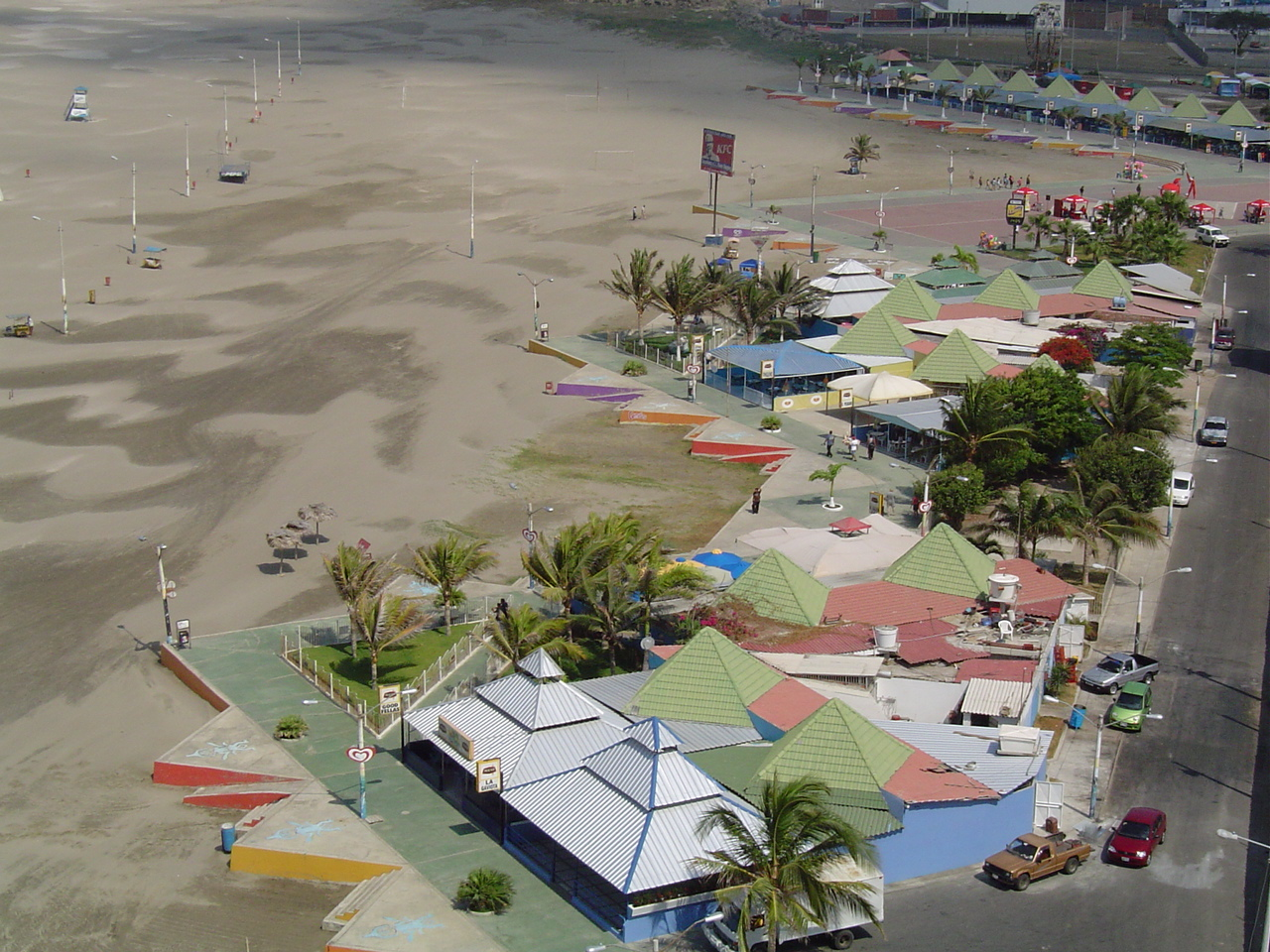
The Malecon Escenico; a boardwalk with stores and seafood restaurants

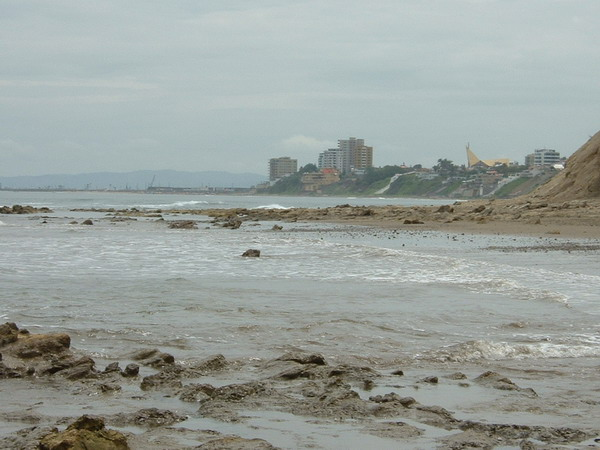
Manta as seen from the Barbasquillo Beach

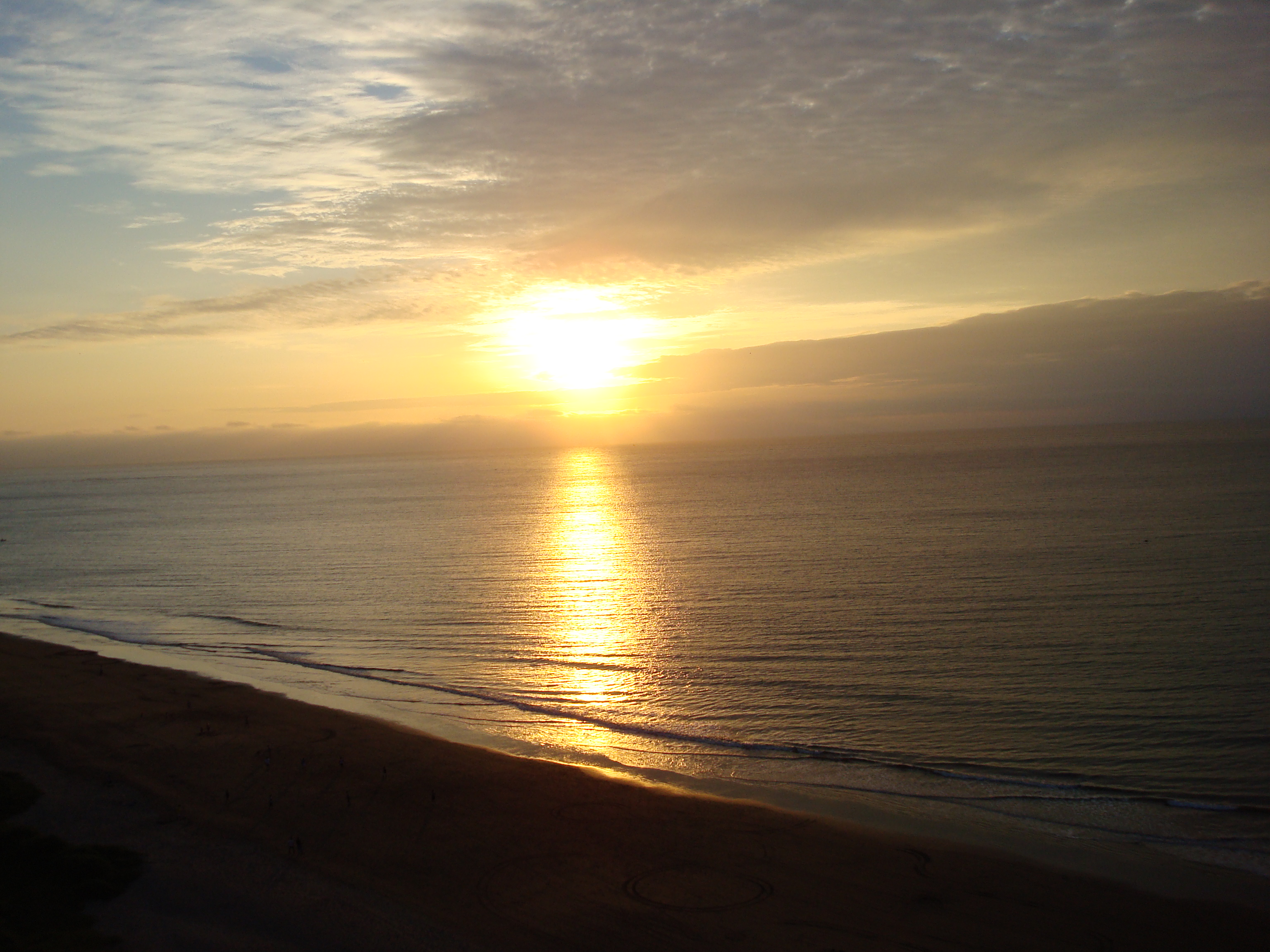
Sunset in the Murcielago Beach

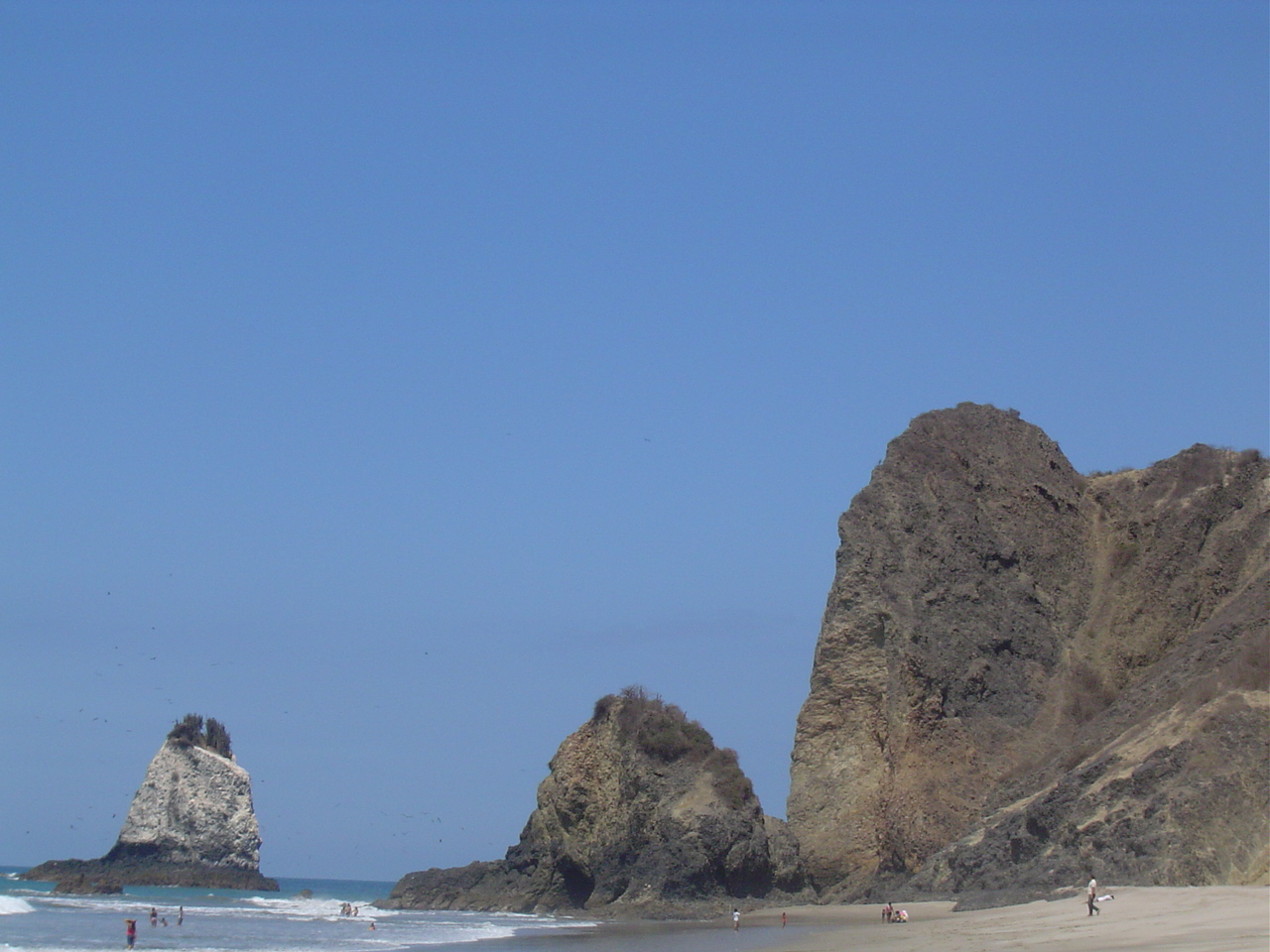
San Lorenzo Beach

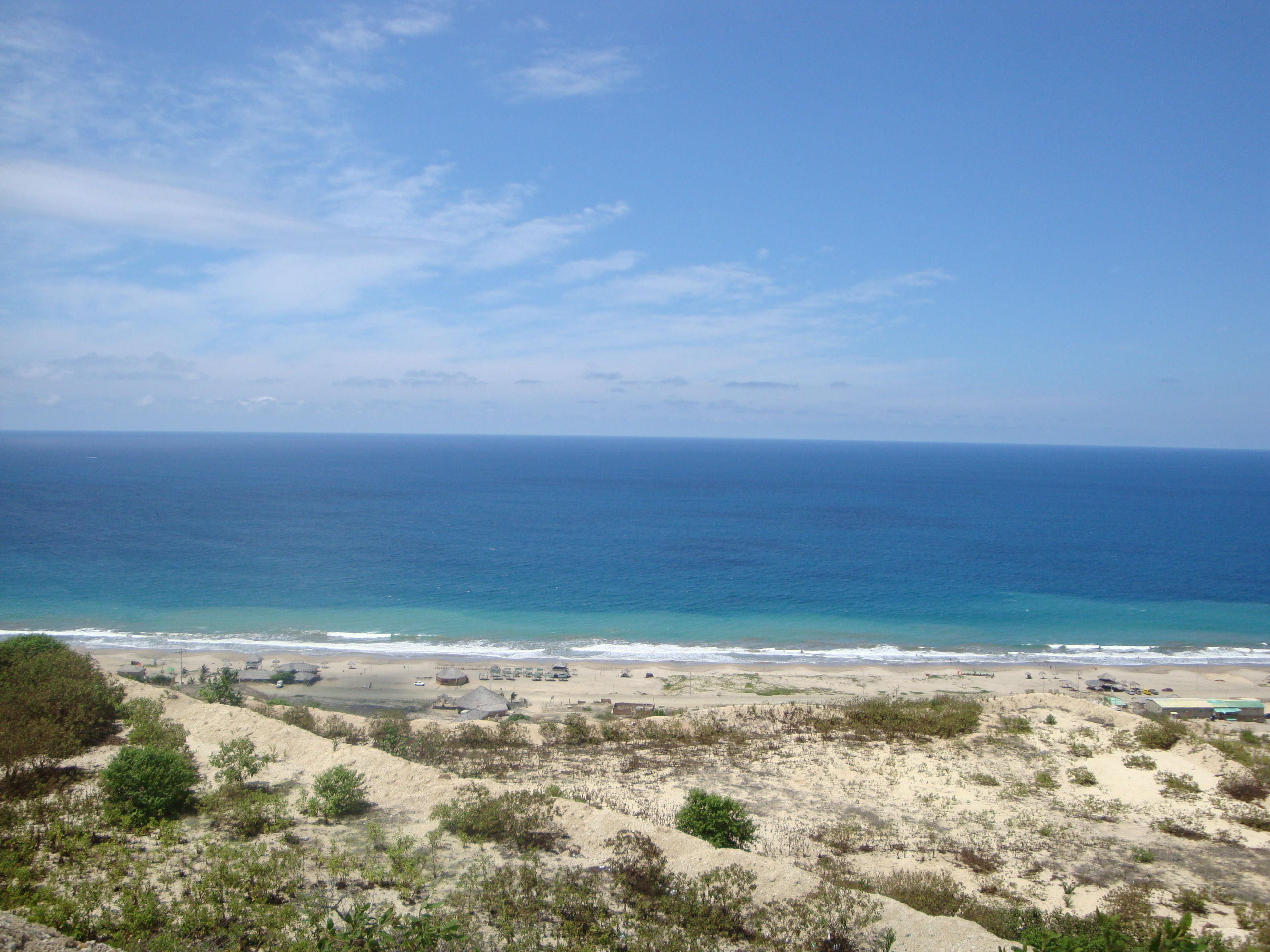
Manta Beach

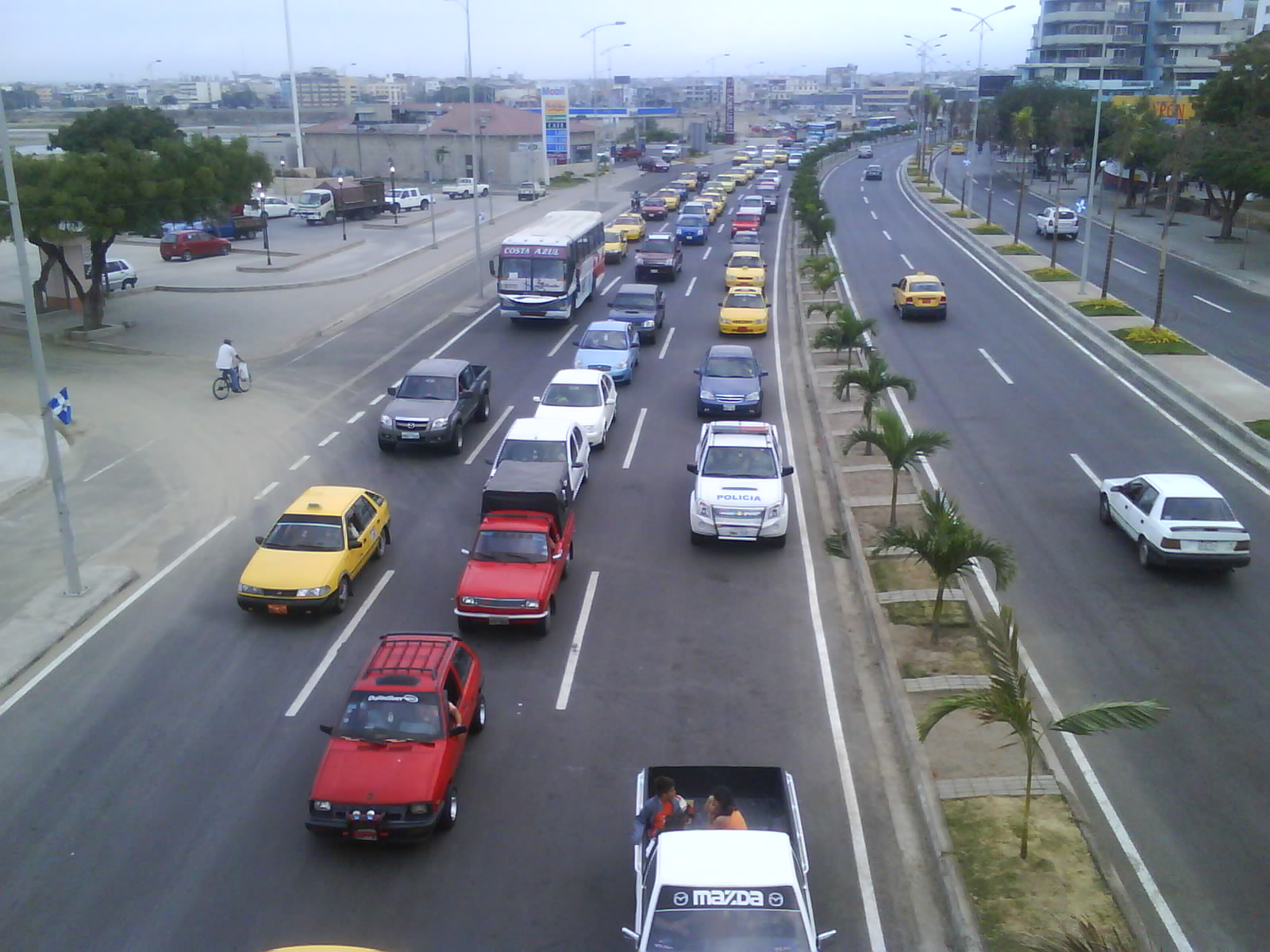
Rush hour traffic

== Education ==
Manta possesses a number of universities and high schools. The largest and most traditional university is Universidad Laica Eloy Alfaro; others include Universidad del Pacifico (Pacific University) and Manta Institute of Technology. The most traditional high schools include Colegio San Jose, Colegio Senoritas Manta, and Colegio Stella Maris.

Foreign-oriented upper class high schools include Jefferson High School (American), Julio Pierregrosse High School (Spanish), and Leonardo da Vinci High School (Italian). These are the most prestigious high schools in the city, keeping international academic standards. The Spanish language school, Academia Surpacifico, has more than 14 years of experience teaching Spanish to foreigners.

== Climate ==
Despite the city's location on the equator, the Humboldt Current gives Manta an arid climate (Köppen BWh). The city is cloudy and hot most of the year, and rainfall is erratic and largely confined to the months between January and April. At these times, it occurs mainly during El Niño events, when the Humboldt Current weakens.

Climate data for Manta, elevation 14 m (46 ft), (1971–2000)
Month	Jan	Feb	Mar	Apr	May	Jun	Jul	Aug	Sep	Oct	Nov	Dec	Year
Record high °C (°F)	35.0 (95.0)	34.4 (93.9)	34.4 (93.9)	35.6 (96.1)	34.4 (93.9)	35.0 (95.0)	35.0 (95.0)	35.6 (96.1)	32.8 (91.0)	33.3 (91.9)	32.2 (90.0)	32.2 (90.0)	35.6 (96.1)
Mean daily maximum °C (°F)	29.8 (85.6)	29.8 (85.6)	29.9 (85.8)	30.2 (86.4)	30.1 (86.2)	28.8 (83.8)	28.2 (82.8)	28.3 (82.9)	28.0 (82.4)	28.1 (82.6)	28.5 (83.3)	29.3 (84.7)	29.1 (84.3)
Mean daily minimum °C (°F)	22.6 (72.7)	23.1 (73.6)	23.0 (73.4)	22.7 (72.9)	22.3 (72.1)	21.3 (70.3)	20.5 (68.9)	20.2 (68.4)	20.2 (68.4)	20.5 (68.9)	21.0 (69.8)	21.6 (70.9)	21.6 (70.9)
Record low °C (°F)	17.2 (63.0)	17.2 (63.0)	13.0 (55.4)	17.2 (63.0)	17.2 (63.0)	13.3 (55.9)	16.1 (61.0)	15.0 (59.0)	15.0 (59.0)	14.4 (57.9)	15.6 (60.1)	15.6 (60.1)	13.0 (55.4)
Average precipitation mm (inches)	30.0 (1.18)	67.0 (2.64)	76.0 (2.99)	31.0 (1.22)	3.0 (0.12)	3.0 (0.12)	0.0 (0.0)	0.0 (0.0)	3.0 (0.12)	1.0 (0.04)	0.0 (0.0)	3.0 (0.12)	217 (8.55)
Average relative humidity (%)	76	79	80	78	76	79	78	78	78	78	77	74	78
Mean monthly sunshine hours	124	113	155	150	124	90	93	93	90	93	90	93	1,308
Source 1: FAO
Source 2: Sistema de Clasificación Bioclimática Mundial (extremes) World Climate Guide (sunshine only)

== Sister cities ==
Manta has one sister city, as designated by Sister Cities International:

- Vladivostok, Russia
