= Greg Jones (tennis) =

Australian tennis player (born 1989)

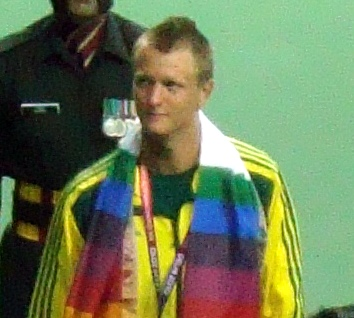
- Country (sports): Australia
- Residence: Sydney, Australia
- Born: 31 January 1989 (age 37) Sydney, New South Wales, Australia
- Height: 1.93 m (6 ft 4 in)
- Turned pro: 2007
- Plays: Right-handed (two-handed backhand)
- Prize money: $337,512

Singles
- Career record: 1–6 (Grand Slam, ATP Tour level, and Davis Cup)
- Career titles: 0
- Highest ranking: No. 179 (26 April 2010)

Grand Slam singles results
- Australian Open: 1R (2012)
- French Open: Q3 (2012)
- Wimbledon: Q2 (2010, 2011)
- US Open: Q3 (2011)

Doubles
- Career record: 4–8 (Grand Slam, ATP Tour level, and Davis Cup)
- Career titles: 0
- Highest ranking: No. 216 (1 November 2010)

Grand Slam doubles results
- Australian Open: 2R (2010, 2011, 2013)
- Last updated on: 28 April 2021.

Greg Jones
Medal record

Representing Australia

Men's Tennis

Commonwealth Games
Silver medal – second place	2010 Delhi	Singles

Greg Jones (born 1989) is a former Australian professional tennis player.

== Early life ==
Born in Sydney, Jones is an only child. He is the son of Russell Jones, a quantity surveyor, and Donna Jones, a teacher's aide. He competed in the Sydney GPS Schools tennis competition representing the Shore school, before eventually forgoing his school education to pursue his tennis career.

Jones competed in a number of high-profile events throughout his junior career including all four of the junior grand slams, most notably making the final of the 2007 French Open.

In 2007, Jones, having reached the finals of the junior event at the French Open, a semifinal at Wimbledon and a quarterfinal finish at the Australian Open, was very hopeful for a win at the last US Open Junior event, which was his last match in the International Tennis Federation Junior Competition.

Jones had a Junior career high ranking of 4 and won 191 out of 219 matches.

== Professional career ==
Jones began playing professional tournaments in 2006. In his fourth ever professional event he made the final of the Burnie challenger in Tasmania, before spending time overseas in future events in an attempt to improve his ranking. Jones finished 2007 ranked 386, given his youth and ranking he was given wildcards into the 2008 Adelaide International qualifying draw, the 2008 Medibank International (which was his first ATP Tour main draw event) and the 2008 Australian Open qualifying draw. The highlight of 2008 for Jones was winning his first futures title in USA and he finished the year ranked 434.

2009 saw Jones compete in all the Australian ATP events again in January, but he was unable to qualify for any of the main draw in either Brisbane, Sydney or the Australian Open. Jones won his second future tournament of his career in April 2009 in Australia, before heading overseas to play in both Challengers and Futures tournaments, which was highlighted by a Challenger semifinal in Russia.

2010 started slowly for Jones, who once again was unable to qualify for Brisbane, Sydney or the Australian Open. In February he was able to make a second finals appearance at the challenger tournament in Burnie, going down to rising star Bernard Tomic in the final, Jones continued his good form with a finals showing in an Australian futures tournament two weeks later. On 10 October 2010, Jones won silver for Australia in the men's singles at the Commonwealth Games in Delhi, losing to India's Somdev Devvarman in the gold medal match played at the R.K. Khanna tennis stadium.

== ATP Challenger and ITF Futures finals ==
=== Singles: 13 (3–10) ===
Legend ATP Challenger (0–5) ITF Futures (3–5)	Finals by surface Hard (1–6) Clay (2–1) Grass (0–3) Carpet (0–0)

Result	W–L	Date	Tournament	Tier	Surface	Opponent	Score
Loss	0–1	Nov 2007	Tasmania, Australia	Challenger	Hard	(Australia) Nathan Healey	5–7, 4–6
Win	1–1	May 2008	USA F10, Orange Park	Futures	Clay	(Australia) Clinton Thomson	5–7, 4–6
Loss	1–2	Jul 2008	Great Britain F10, Frinton on Sea	Futures	Grass	(Netherlands) Michel Koning	4–6, 3–6
Loss	1–3	Oct 2008	Australia F10, Happy Valley	Futures	Hard	(Australia) Marinko Matosevic	1–6, 6–7^{3–7}
Loss	1–4	May 2009	Australia F3, Bundaberg	Futures	Clay	(New Zealand) Jose Statham	6–4, 4–6, 1–6
Win	2–4	May 2009	Australia F4, Ipswich	Futures	Clay	(New Zealand) Jose Statham	6–4, 4–6, 1–6
Loss	2–5	Feb 2010	Burnie, Australia	Challenger	Hard	(Australia) Bernard Tomic	6–4, 6–2
Loss	2–6	Feb 2010	Australia F2, Berri	Futures	Grass	(Australia) John Millman	6–1, 4–6, 4–6
Loss	2–7	May 2011	Fergana, Uzbekistan	Challenger	Hard	(Israel) Dudi Sela	2–6, 1–6
Loss	2–8	Feb 2012	Caloundra, Australia	Challenger	Hard	(Australia) Marinko Matosevic	0–6, 2–6
Loss	2–9	Jul 2013	Manta, Ecuador	Challenger	Hard	(United States) Michael Russell	6–4, 0–6, 5–7
Win	3–9	Oct 2013	Australia F9, Sydney	Futures	Hard	(Australia) Jordan Thompson	3–6, 7–5, 6–1
Loss	3–10	Mar 2016	Australia F2, Mildura	Futures	Grass	(Australia) Dayne Kelly	4–6, 2–6

== ATP Challenger and ITF Futures finals ==
=== Doubles: 12 (4–8) ===
Legend ATP Challenger (0–3) ITF Futures (4–5)	Finals by surface Hard (2–5) Clay (1–3) Grass (1–0) Carpet (0–0)

Result	W–L	Date	Tournament	Tier	Surface	Partner	Opponents	Score
Loss	0–1	May 2007	Kuwait F1, Meshref	Futures	Hard	(Kuwait) Mohammad Ghareeb	(Pakistan) Aisam Qureshi (India) Purav Raja	6–2, 5–7, 2–6
Loss	0–2	Oct 2007	Australia F8, Traralgon	Futures	Hard	(Australia) Andrew Coelho	(Australia) Brydan Klein (Australia) Matthew Ebden	6–7^{(6–8)}, 1–6
Win	1–2	Sep 2008	Australia F7, Gympie	Futures	Hard	(Australia) Adam Hubble	(Barbados) Haydn Lewis (New Zealand) Mikal Statham	7–6^{(8–6)}, 6–7^{(4–7)}, [10–5]
Loss	1–3	Oct 2008	Australia F9, Sale	Futures	Clay	(Australia) Andrew Gregory	(Australia) Dane Propoggia (Australia) Matt Reid	walkover
Loss	1–4	May 2009	Italy F11, Parma	Futures	Clay	(Netherlands) Antal van der Duim	(Argentina) Juan-Martín Aranguren (Italy) Walter Trusendi	2–6, 3–6
Win	2–4	Jul 2009	Great Britain F8, Felixstowe	Futures	Grass	(Australia) Robert Smeets	(Republic of Ireland) Tristan Farron-Mahon (Sweden) Andreas Siljeström	6–2, 6–4
Loss	2–5	Jul 2010	Aptos, United States	Challenger	Hard	(Australia) Adam Feeney	(Australia) Carsten Ball (Australia) Chris Guccione	1–6, 3–6
Loss	2–6	Feb 2013	West Lakes, Australia	Challenger	Hard	(Australia) James Duckworth	(Australia) Matt Reid (Australia) Sam Groth	2–6, 4–6
Loss	2–7	May 2013	Tallahassee, United States	Challenger	Clay	(Canada) Peter Polansky	(United States) Austin Krajicek (United States) Tennys Sandgren	6–1, 2–6, [8–10]
Win	3–7	Sep 2014	USA F26, Irvine	Futures	Hard	(United States) Gregory Ouellette	(Australia) Carsten Ball (United States) Junior Alexander Ore	6–2, 4–6, [10–5]
Win	4–7	Mar 2016	Australia F3, Mornington	Futures	Clay	(Australia) Andrew Whittington	(Australia) Gavin Van Peperzeel (Australia) Bradley Mousley	6–3, 6–2
Loss	4–8	Jun 2016	USA F17, Charlottesville	Futures	Hard	(New Zealand) Jose Statham	(United States) Thai-Son Kwiatkowski (United States) Mac Styslinger	4–6, 1–6

== Junior Grand Slam finals ==
=== Singles: 1 (1 runner-up) ===
Result	Year	Tournament	Surface	Opponent	Score
Loss	2007	French Open	Clay	(Belarus) Uladzimir Ignatik	3–6, 4–6

== Performance timeline ==
Key
W	F	SF	QF	#R	RR	Q#	DNQ	A	NH

(W) winner; (F) finalist; (SF) semifinalist; (QF) quarterfinalist; (#R) rounds 4, 3, 2, 1; (RR) round-robin stage; (Q#) qualification round; (DNQ) did not qualify; (A) absent; (NH) not held; (SR) strike rate (events won / competed); (W–L) win–loss record.

=== Singles ===
Tournament	2007	2008	2009	2010	2011	2012	2013	2014	SR	W–L	Win %
Grand Slam tournaments
Australian Open	Q1	Q2	Q1	Q1	Q3	1R	A	Q1	0 / 1	0–1	0%
French Open	A	A	A	Q1	A	Q3	A	A	0 / 0	0–0	–
Wimbledon	A	A	A	Q2	Q2	A	A	A	0 / 0	0–0	–
US Open	A	A	A	Q2	Q3	A	Q1	A	0 / 0	0–0	–
Win–loss	0–0	0–0	0–0	0–0	0–0	0–1	0–0	0–0	0 / 1	0–1	0%
ATP Tour Masters 1000
Indian Wells Masters	A	A	A	A	Q2	Q1	A	A	0 / 0	0–0	–
Win–loss	0–0	0–0	0–0	0–0	0–0	0–0	0–0	0–0	0 / 0	0–0	–
