= Manta Open =

Defunct tennis tournament
- Event name: Manta Open Trofeo Ricardo Delgado Aray (2004-2014)
- Location: Manta, Ecuador
- Venue: Umiña Tenis Club
- Category: ATP Challenger Tour
- Surface: Hard

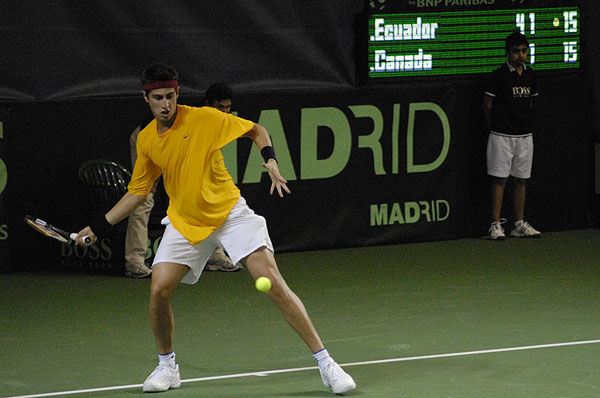
Ecuadorian Giovanni Lapentti is a two-time winner in Manta, having taken the singles title in 2004 and 2008

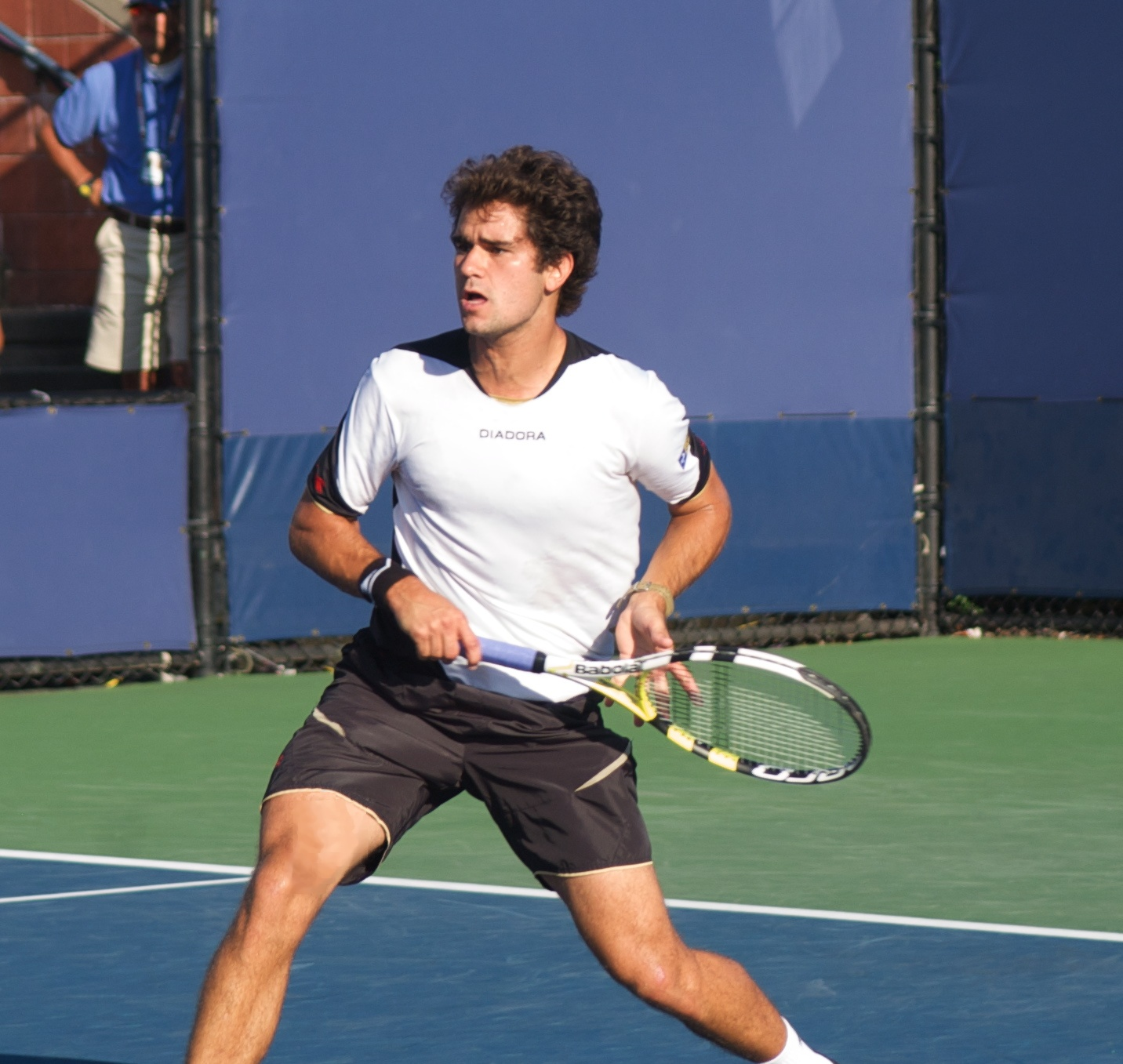
Brazilian Thiago Alves won two back-to-back singles titles at the event in 2005 and 2006

The Manta Open is a professional tennis event played on outdoor hardcourts. It is part of the ATP Challenger Tour. It is held annually at the Umiña Tenis Club in Manta, Ecuador. The event was announced to come back in 2026 after 12 years of absence, but was subsequently cancelled.

== Past finals ==
=== Singles ===
Year	Champion	Runner-up	Score
2015–2026	Not held		
2014	(France) Adrian Mannarino	(Argentina) Guido Andreozzi	4–6, 6–3, 6–2
2013	(United States) Michael Russell	(Australia) Greg Jones	4–6, 6–0, 7–5
2012	(Argentina) Guido Pella	(Argentina) Maximiliano Estévez	6–4, 7–5
2011	(Argentina) Brian Dabul	(Argentina) Facundo Argüello	6–1, 6–3
2010	(Japan) Go Soeda	(United States) Ryler DeHeart	7–6^{(7–5)}, 6–2
2009	(Argentina) Horacio Zeballos	(France) Vincent Millot	3–6, 7–5, 6–3
2008	(Ecuador) Giovanni Lapentti	(Brazil) Ricardo Mello	6–2, 6–4
2007	(Japan) Go Soeda	(Argentina) Eduardo Schwank	6–4, 6–2
2006	(Brazil) Thiago Alves	(Argentina) Brian Dabul	6–2, 6–2
2005	(Brazil) Thiago Alves	(United States) Lesley Joseph	6–4, 6–1
2004	(Ecuador) Giovanni Lapentti	(Argentina) Carlos Berlocq	6–7^{(2–7)}, 6–3, 6–4

=== Doubles ===
Year	Champions	Runners-up	Score
2014	(United States) Chase Buchanan (Canada) Peter Polansky	(Venezuela) Luis David Martinez (Colombia) Eduardo Struvay	6–4, 6–4
2013	(El Salvador) Marcelo Arévalo (Peru) Sergio Galdós	(Colombia) Alejandro González (Colombia) Carlos Salamanca	6–3, 6–4
2012	(Peru) Duilio Beretta (Argentina) Renzo Olivo	(Dominican Republic) Víctor Estrella Burgos (Brazil) João Souza	6–3, 6–0
2011	(Argentina) Brian Dabul (South Africa) Izak van der Merwe	(United States) John Paul Fruttero (South Africa) Raven Klaasen	6–1, 6–7^{(2–7)}, [11–9]
2010	(United States) Ryler DeHeart (Canada) Pierre-Ludovic Duclos	(Germany) Martin Emmrich (Sweden) Andreas Siljeström	6–4, 7–5
2009	(Brazil) Ricardo Hocevar (Brazil) André Miele	(Mexico) Santiago González (Argentina) Horacio Zeballos	6–1, 2–6, [10–7]
2008	(Colombia) Alejandro González (Colombia) Eduardo Struvay	(Dominican Republic) Víctor Estrella Burgos (Argentina) Alejandro Fabbri	7–5, 3–6, [10–7]
2007	(Argentina) Eduardo Schwank (Argentina) Horacio Zeballos	(United States) John-Paul Fruttero (United States) Eric Nunez	6–4, 6–2
2006	(United States) Eric Nunez (Netherlands Antilles) Jean-Julien Rojer	(United States) Nicholas Monroe (Romania) Horia Tecău	6–3, 6–2
2005	(Argentina) Brian Dabul (Uruguay) Marcel Felder	(Brazil) Franco Ferreiro (Brazil) Marcelo Melo	6–3, 4–6, 6–4
2004	(Brazil) Marcos Daniel (Mexico) Santiago González	(United States) Eric Nunez (Venezuela) Jimy Szymanski	3–6, 6–2, 7–6^{(7–5)}
