= Iván Endara =

Ecuadorian tennis player

- Country (sports): Ecuador
- Residence: Florida, U.S.
- Born: 4 March 1988 (age 38) Quito, Ecuador
- Height: 1.79 m (5 ft 10 1/2 in)
- Turned pro: 2006
- Plays: Right-handed (two-handed backhand)
- Prize money: $125,274

Singles
- Career record: 5–9
- Career titles: 0
- Highest ranking: No. 367 (20 July 2015)

Grand Slam singles results
- US Open: 1-1

Doubles
- Career record: 1–1
- Career titles: 0
- Highest ranking: No. 387 (5 October 2009)

Iván Endara (Spanish pronunciation: [iˈβan enˈdaɾa]; born 4 March 1988) is an Ecuadorian professional tennis player.

== ATP Tournaments Finals ==
=== Titles (3) ===
Legend
ITF Futures Series (3–11)

Outcome	No.	Date	Tournament	Surface	Opponent	Score
Runner-up	1.	30 July 2007	Lima, Peru	Clay	(Argentina) Alejandro Kon	7–5, 2–6, 2–6
Winner	2.	11 August 2008	Quito, Ecuador	Hard	(Peru) Mauricio Echazú	7–6^{(7–3)}, 6–3
Runner-up	3.	6 October 2008	Ibarra, Ecuador	Clay	(Italy) Damiano Di Ienno	6–1, 6–7^{(5–7)}, 4–6
Runner-up	4.	10 August 2009	Guayaquil, Ecuador	Clay	(Ecuador) Julio César Campozano	1–6, 6–4, 2–6
Runner-up	5.	30 November 2009	Arequipa, Peru	Clay	(Germany) Andre Begemann	7–6^{(7–4)}, 2–6, 2–6
Runner-up	6.	25 January 2010	Guatemala City, Guatemala	Hard	(Romania) Marius Copil	6–7^{(5–7)}, 6–7^{(3–7)}
Runner-up	7.	7 June 2010	Maracaibo, Venezuela	Hard	(Colombia) Robert Farah	4–6, 2–6
Runner-up	8.	11 October 2010	Caracas, Venezuela	Hard	(United States) Greg Ouellette	3–6, 1–6
Runner-up	9.	12 December 2010	Guerrero, Mexico	Clay	(Austria) Rainer Eitzinger	2–6, 3–6
Runner-up	10.	8 August 2011	Guayaquil, Ecuador	Clay	(Uruguay) Marcel Felder	6–4, 5–7, 1–6
Runner-up	11.	6 May 2011	Maracay, Venezuela	Hard	(Dominican Republic) José Hernández-Fernández	3–6, 3–6
Winner	12.	13 May 2011	Maracaibo, Venezuela	Hard	(Venezuela) David Souto	7–6^{(7–4)}, 4–6, 6–4
Runner-up	13.	11 August 2014	Guayaquil, Ecuador	Hard	(Ecuador) Gonzalo Escobar	3–6, 5–7
Winner	14.	11 May 2015	Mexico City, Mexico	Hard	(United States) Stefan Kozlov	6–1, 7–6^{(7–3)}
