= 2015 Davis Cup Americas Zone Group III =

International tennis competition

The Americas Zone was one of the four zones within Group 3 of the regional Davis Cup competition in 2015. The zone's competition was held in round robin format in Panama City, Panama, in July 2015. The nine competing nations were divided into one pool of four and one of five. The winners and runners up from each pool played off to determine the two nations to be promoted to Americas Zone Group II in 2016, while the third and fourth placed nations played to off to determine overall placings within the group.

== Participating nations ==
- Bahamas
- Bermuda
- Cuba
- Guatemala
- Honduras
- Jamaica
- Panama
- Paraguay
- Trinidad and Tobago

== Draw ==
The nine teams were divided into one pool of four and one of five. The winner of each pool plays off against the runner-up of the other pool, and the two winners of these play-offs are promoted to Americas Zone Group II in 2016. The third and fourth placed teams in each pool play off against the equivalent team from the other pool to determine overall rankings within the group. The fifth placed team in Pool B does not enter the play-offs.

The group was staged from the 20th to 25 July 2015 at the Centro de Alto Rendimiento Fred Maduro in Panama City, Panama.

Pool A

	Paraguay	Cuba	Honduras	Panama	RR W–L	Matches W–L	Sets W–L	Games W–L	Standings
Paraguay		3–0	3–0	3–0	3–0	9–0	18–2	114–65	1
Cuba	0–3		2–1	3–0	2–1	5–4	12–9	104–100	2
Honduras	0–3	1–2		2–1	1–2	3–6	7–14	86–111	3
Panama	0–3	0–3	1–2		0–3	1–8	5–17	92–120	4

Pool B

	Guatemala	Jamaica	Bahamas	Trinidad and Tobago	Bermuda	RR W–L	Matches W–L	Sets W–L	Games W–L	Standings
Guatemala		2–1	3–0	3–0	3–0	4–0	11–1	22–5	157–98	1
Jamaica	1–2		2–1	3–0	2–1	3–1	8–4	18–9	142–120	2
Bahamas	0–3	1–2		2–1	3–0	2–2	6–6	14–12	128–122	3
Trinidad and Tobago	0–3	0–3	1–2		2–1	1–3	3–9	6–20	97–144	4
Bermuda	0–3	1–2	0–3	1–2		0–4	2–10	7–21	114–154	5

== First round ==
=== Pool A ===
==== Paraguay vs. Panama ====
Paraguay
3
Centro de Alto Rendimiento Fred Maduro, Panama City, Panama
20 July 2015
Red Clay, Outdoor

Panama
0

			1	2	3
1	(Paraguay) (Panama)	Gustavo Ramírez; Walner Espinoza	6; 3	6; 2
2	(Paraguay) (Panama)	Ayed Zatar; José Gilbert Gómez	6; 4	6; 4
3	(Paraguay) (Panama)	Juan Borba / Bruno Brítez; Walner Espinoza / Luis Fernando García	3; 6	6; 3	7; 5

==== Honduras vs. Cuba ====
Honduras
1
Centro de Alto Rendimiento Fred Maduro, Panama City, Panama
20 July 2015
Red Clay, Outdoor

Cuba
2

			1	2	3
1	(Honduras) (Cuba)	Keny Turcios; Omar Hernández Moreno	6^{6} 7^{8}	6^{3} 7^{7}
2	(Honduras) (Cuba)	Ricardo Pineda; William Dorantes Sanchez	2; 6	4; 6
3	(Honduras) (Cuba)	Alejandro Obando / Keny Turcios; Yasier Estrada / Omar Hernández Moreno	2; 6	6; 4	6; 4

==== Honduras vs. Panama ====
Honduras
2
Centro de Alto Rendimiento Fred Maduro, Panama City, Panama
21 July 2015
Red Clay, Outdoor

Panama
1

			1	2	3
1	(Honduras) (Panama)	Alejandro Obando; Luis Fernando García	6; 3	6; 3
2	(Honduras) (Panama)	Ricardo Pineda; Walner Espinoza	2; 6	6; 4	3; 6
3	(Honduras) (Panama)	Alejandro Obando / Keny Turcios; Walner Espinoza / Luis Fernando García	6; 2	5; 7	6; 4

==== Paraguay vs. Cuba ====
Paraguay
3
Centro de Alto Rendimiento Fred Maduro, Panama City, Panama
21 July 2015
Red Clay, Outdoor

Cuba
0

			1	2	3
1	(Paraguay) (Cuba)	Ayed Zatar; Omar Hernández Moreno	6; 2	7; 5
2	(Paraguay) (Cuba)	Juan Borba; William Dorantes Sanchez	2; 6	6; 1	6; 2
3	(Paraguay) (Cuba)	Bruno Brítez / Ayed Zatar; Yasier Estrada / Omar Hernández Moreno	7; 5	6; 3

==== Cuba vs. Panama ====
Cuba
3
Centro de Alto Rendimiento Fred Maduro, Panama City, Panama
23 July 2015
Red Clay, Outdoor

Panama
0

			1	2	3
1	(Cuba) (Panama)	Omar Hernández Moreno; Walner Espinoza	6; 4	2; 6	6; 2
2	(Cuba) (Panama)	William Dorantes Sanchez; José Gilbert Gómez	7; 5	6; 3
3	(Cuba) (Panama)	Yasier Estrada / Omar Hernández Moreno; Luis Fernando García / Luis Gómez	6; 4	7^{9} 6^{7}

==== Paraguay vs. Honduras ====
Paraguay
3
Centro de Alto Rendimiento Fred Maduro, Panama City, Panama
23 July 2015
Red Clay, Outdoor

Honduras
0

			1	2	3
1	(Paraguay) (Honduras)	Ayed Zatar; Alejandro Obando	6; 1	6; 0
2	(Paraguay) (Honduras)	Juan Borba; Keny Turcios	6; 2	6; 4
3	(Paraguay) (Honduras)	Bruno Brítez / Gustavo Ramírez; Ricardo Lau Cooper / Ricardo Pineda	6; 4	6; 3

=== Pool B ===
==== Guatemala vs. Bahamas ====
Guatemala
3
Centro de Alto Rendimiento Fred Maduro, Panama City, Panama
20 July 2015
Red Clay, Outdoor

Bahamas
0

			1	2	3
1	(Guatemala) (The Bahamas)	Wilfredo González; Rodney Carey	6; 2	6^{4} 7^{7}	6; 4
2	(Guatemala) (The Bahamas)	Christopher Díaz Figueroa; Kevin Major	6; 4	6; 1
3	(Guatemala) (The Bahamas)	Christopher Díaz Figueroa / Wilfredo González; Jamaal Adderley / Marvin Rolle	6; 3	6; 3

==== Jamaica vs. Bermuda ====
Jamaica
2
Centro de Alto Rendimiento Fred Maduro, Panama City, Panama
20 July 2015
Red Clay, Outdoor

Bermuda
1

			1	2	3
1	(Jamaica) (Bermuda)	Rowland Phillips; Gavin Manders	7^{7} 6^{4}	6; 1
2	(Jamaica) (Bermuda)	Damion Johnson; David Thomas	6^{6} 7^{8}	6; 1	0; 5	retired
3	(Jamaica) (Bermuda)	Brandon Burke / Rowland Phillips; Jenson Bascome / Neal Towlson	6; 2	7; 5

==== Bahamas vs. Trinidad and Tobago ====
Bahamas
2
Centro de Alto Rendimiento Fred Maduro, Panama City, Panama
21 July 2015
Red Clay, Outdoor

Trinidad and Tobago
1

			1	2	3
1	(The Bahamas) (Trinidad and Tobago)	Rodney Carey; Vaughn Wilson	3; 6	6^{6} 7^{8}
2	(The Bahamas) (Trinidad and Tobago)	Kevin Major; Ethan Ammon	6; 2	6; 4
3	(The Bahamas) (Trinidad and Tobago)	Jamaal Adderley / Marvin Rolle; Akiel Duke / Vaughn Wilson	6; 3	6; 1

==== Guatemala vs. Jamaica ====
Guatemala
2
Centro de Alto Rendimiento Fred Maduro, Panama City, Panama
21 July 2015
Red Clay, Outdoor

Jamaica
1

			1	2	3
1	(Guatemala) (Jamaica)	Wilfredo González; Rowland Phillips	2; 6	5; 7
2	(Guatemala) (Jamaica)	Christopher Díaz Figueroa; Damion Johnson	6; 2	6; 2
3	(Guatemala) (Jamaica)	Christopher Díaz Figueroa / Wilfredo González; Brandon Burke / Rowland Phillips	6; 1	6^{4} 7^{7}	7^{7} 6^{2}

==== Bahamas vs. Bermuda ====
Bahamas
3
Centro de Alto Rendimiento Fred Maduro, Panama City, Panama
22 July 2015
Red Clay, Outdoor

Bermuda
0

			1	2	3
1	(The Bahamas) (Bermuda)	Rodney Carey; Gavin Manders	7^{8} 6^{6}	6; 3
2	(The Bahamas) (Bermuda)	Kevin Major; David Thomas	6; 4	6; 2
3	(The Bahamas) (Bermuda)	Jamaal Adderley / Marvin Rolle; Jenson Bascome / Neal Towlson	7; 5	6; 3

==== Guatemala vs. Trinidad and Tobago ====
Guatemala
3
Centro de Alto Rendimiento Fred Maduro, Panama City, Panama
22 July 2015
Red Clay, Outdoor

Trinidad and Tobago
0

			1	2	3
1	(Guatemala) (Trinidad and Tobago)	Wilfredo González; Vaughn Wilson	6; 4	6; 1
2	(Guatemala) (Trinidad and Tobago)	Christopher Díaz Figueroa; Ethan Ammon	6; 2	6; 1
3	(Guatemala) (Trinidad and Tobago)	Christopher Díaz Figueroa / Stefan Emilio González; Ethan Ammon / Dexter Mahase	6; 4	6; 4

==== Jamaica vs. Trinidad and Tobago ====
Jamaica
3
Centro de Alto Rendimiento Fred Maduro, Panama City, Panama
23 July 2015
Red Clay, Outdoor

Trinidad and Tobago
0

			1	2	3
1	(Jamaica) (Trinidad and Tobago)	Rowland Phillips; Vaughn Wilson	6; 2	7; 5
2	(Jamaica) (Trinidad and Tobago)	Damion Johnson; Ethan Ammon	7^{7} 6^{2}	6; 0
3	(Jamaica) (Trinidad and Tobago)	Brandon Burke / Daniel Harris; Akiel Duke / Dexter Mahase	7^{7} 6^{5}	6; 2

==== Guatemala vs. Bermuda ====
Guatemala
3
Centro de Alto Rendimiento Fred Maduro, Panama City, Panama
23 July 2015
Red Clay, Outdoor

Bermuda
0

			1	2	3
1	(Guatemala) (Bermuda)	Wilfredo González; David Thomas	7; 5	6; 4
2	(Guatemala) (Bermuda)	Christopher Díaz Figueroa; Jenson Bascome	6; 3	6; 1
3	(Guatemala) (Bermuda)	Christopher Díaz Figueroa / Stefan Emilio González; Gavin Manders / Neal Towlson	6; 4	4; 6	6; 4

==== Bahamas vs. Jamaica ====
Bahamas
1
Centro de Alto Rendimiento Fred Maduro, Panama City, Panama
24 July 2015
Red Clay, Outdoor

Jamaica
2

			1	2	3
1	(The Bahamas) (Jamaica)	Rodney Carey; Daniel Harris	6; 3	6; 4
2	(The Bahamas) (Jamaica)	Kevin Major; Rowland Phillips	5; 7	0; 6
3	(The Bahamas) (Jamaica)	Jamaal Adderley / Marvin Rolle; Brandon Burke / Rowland Phillips	6; 1	6^{6} 7^{8}	4; 6

==== Bermuda vs. Trinidad and Tobago ====
Bermuda
1
Centro de Alto Rendimiento Fred Maduro, Panama City, Panama
24 July 2015
Red Clay, Outdoor

Trinidad and Tobago
2

			1	2	3
1	(Bermuda) (Trinidad and Tobago)	Gavin Manders; Vaughn Wilson	6; 3	1; 6	1; 6
2	(Bermuda) (Trinidad and Tobago)	David Thomas; Ethan Ammon	4; 6	6; 3	6^{3} 7^{7}
3	(Bermuda) (Trinidad and Tobago)	Jenson Bascome / Neal Towlson; Akiel Duke / Dexter Mahase	6; 2	6; 4

== Play-offs ==
=== Promotion ===
==== Paraguay vs. Jamaica ====
Paraguay
2
Centro de Alto Rendimiento Fred Maduro, Panama City, Panama
25 July 2015
Red Clay, Outdoor

Jamaica
0

			1	2	3
1	(Paraguay) (Jamaica)	Ayed Zatar; Rowland Phillips	6; 4	6^{6} 7^{8}	7; 5
2	(Paraguay) (Jamaica)	Juan Borba; Damion Johnson	6; 1	6; 1
3	(Paraguay) (Jamaica)	Gustavo Ramírez / Ayed Zatar; Brandon Burke / Rowland Phillips				not played

==== Guatemala vs. Cuba ====
Guatemala
2
Centro de Alto Rendimiento Fred Maduro, Panama City, Panama
25 July 2015
Red Clay, Outdoor

Cuba
0

			1	2	3
1	(Guatemala) (Cuba)	Wilfredo González; Omar Hernández Moreno	6; 3	6; 1
2	(Guatemala) (Cuba)	Christopher Díaz Figueroa; William Dorantes Sanchez	6; 4	6; 2
3	(Guatemala) (Cuba)	Christopher Díaz Figueroa / Wilfredo González; Yasier Estrada / Omar Hernández Moreno				not played

=== 5th place play-off: Honduras vs. Bahamas ===
Honduras
2
Centro de Alto Rendimiento Fred Maduro, Panama City, Panama
25 July 2015
Red Clay, Outdoor

Bahamas
0

			1	2	3
1	(Honduras) (The Bahamas)	Alejandro Obando; Rodney Carey	6; 3	6; 4
2	(Honduras) (The Bahamas)	Keny Turcios; Kevin Major	6; 1			retired
3	(Honduras) (The Bahamas)	Alejandro Obando / Keny Turcios; Jamaal Adderley / Marvin Rolle				not played

=== 7th place play-off: Panama vs. Trinidad and Tobago ===
Panama
2
Centro de Alto Rendimiento Fred Maduro, Panama City, Panama
25 July 2015
Red Clay, Outdoor

Trinidad and Tobago
0

			1	2	3
1	(Panama) (Trinidad and Tobago)	Walner Espinoza; Vaughn Wilson	6; 1	6; 0
2	(Panama) (Trinidad and Tobago)	Luis Gómez; Ethan Ammon	4; 6	6; 3	6; 2
3	(Panama) (Trinidad and Tobago)	Luis Fernando García / José Gilbert Gómez; Akiel Duke / Dexter Mahase				not played

== Outcomes ==
- Guatemala and Paraguay promoted to Americas Zone Group II in 2016
- Bahamas, Bermuda, Cuba, Honduras, Jamaica, Panama and Trinidad and Tobago remain in Americas Zone Group III in 2016
