= 2017 Davis Cup Americas Zone Group II =

International tennis competition

The Americas Zone is one of the three zones of the regional Davis Cup competition in 2017.

In the Americas Zone there are three different tiers, called groups, in which teams compete against each other to advance to the upper tier. Winners in Group II advance to the Americas Zone Group I. Teams who lose their respective ties will compete in the relegation play-offs, with winning teams remaining in Group II, whereas teams who lose their play-offs will be relegated to the Americas Zone Group III in 2018.

== Participating nations ==
Seeds:

1. Barbados
2. Venezuela
3. Mexico
4. El Salvador

Remaining nations:

- Bahamas
- Bolivia
- Guatemala
- Paraguay

=== Draw ===
Play-offs
Zapopan, Mexico (hard)
Paraguay | 0
3 | Mexico | 5
Santa Cruz de la Sierra, Bolivia (clay)
Bolivia | 4
Bahamas | 1

First Round
Asunción, Paraguay (clay)
1 | Barbados | 3
Paraguay | 2
Guatemala City, Guatemala (hard)
3 | Mexico | 1
Guatemala | 3
San Salvador, El Salvador (hard)
Bolivia | 2
4 | El Salvador | 3
Doral, United States (hard)
Bahamas | 0
2 | Venezuela | 5

Second Round
Saint Michael, Barbados (hard)
1 | Barbados | 3
Guatemala | 2
Doral, United States (hard)
4 | El Salvador | 2
2 | Venezuela | 3

Third Round
Wildey, Barbados (hard)
1 | Barbados | 3
2 | Venezuela | 2

- Paraguay and Bahamas relegated to Group III in 2018.
- Barbados promoted to Group I in 2018.

== First round ==
=== Paraguay vs. Barbados ===
Paraguay
2
Rakiura Resort, Asunción, Paraguay
3–5 February 2017
Clay

Barbados
3

| | | | 1 | 2 | 3 | 4 | 5 |
|---|---|---|---|---|---|---|---|
| 1 | (Paraguay) (Barbados) | Ayed Zatar; Haydn Lewis | 7^{7} 6^{5} | 7; 5 | 6; 2 |
| 2 | (Paraguay) (Barbados) | Bruno Brítez; Darian King | 2; 6 | 3; 6 | 3; 6 |
| 3 | (Paraguay) (Barbados) | Bruno Brítez / Ayed Zatar; Darian King / Haydn Lewis | 4; 6 | 4; 6 | 6^{5} 7^{7} |
| 4 | (Paraguay) (Barbados) | Ayed Zatar; Darian King | 6^{2} 7^{7} | 1; 6 | 1; 6 |
| 5 | (Paraguay) (Barbados) | Bruno Brítez; Seanon Williams | 6; 3 | 6; 2 |

=== Guatemala vs. Mexico ===
Guatemala
3
Federación Nacional de Tenis de Campo, Guatemala City, Guatemala
3–5 February 2017
Hard

Mexico
1

| | | | 1 | 2 | 3 | 4 | 5 |
|---|---|---|---|---|---|---|---|---|
| 1 | (Guatemala) (Mexico) | Wilfredo González; Luis Patiño | 6; 4 | 6; 2 | 6; 4 |
| 2 | (Guatemala) (Mexico) | Christopher Díaz Figueroa; Manuel Sánchez | 2; 6 | 2; 6 | 6^{2} 7^{7} |
| 3 | (Guatemala) (Mexico) | Christopher Díaz Figueroa / Wilfredo González; Luis Patiño / Manuel Sánchez | 6; 4 | 4; 6 | 6; 4 | 3; 6 | 6; 4 |
| 4 | (Guatemala) (Mexico) | Christopher Díaz Figueroa; Gerardo López Villaseñor | 6^{5} 7^{7} | 6; 4 | 7; 5 | 6; 2 |
| 5 | (Guatemala) (Mexico) | Wilfredo González; Manuel Sánchez | | | | | | not played |

=== El Salvador vs. Bolivia ===
El Salvador
3
Circulo Deportivo Internacional, San Salvador, El Salvador
3–5 February 2017
Hard

Bolivia
2

| | | | 1 | 2 | 3 | 4 | 5 |
|---|---|---|---|---|---|---|---|
| 1 | (El Salvador) (Bolivia) | Alberto Emmanuel Alvarado Larín; Federico Zeballos | 4; 6 | 2; 6 | 3; 6 |
| 2 | (El Salvador) (Bolivia) | Marcelo Arévalo; Hugo Dellien | 6; 2 | 6; 4 | 7; 5 |
| 3 | (El Salvador) (Bolivia) | Marcelo Arévalo / Rafael Arévalo; Rodrigo Banzer / Hugo Dellien | 6; 4 | 6^{5} 7^{7} | 6; 4 | 6; 2 |
| 4 | (El Salvador) (Bolivia) | Marcelo Arévalo; Federico Zeballos | 6; 3 | 6; 3 | 6; 1 |
| 5 | (El Salvador) (Bolivia) | Alberto Emmanuel Alvarado Larín; Rodrigo Banzer | 2; 6 | 0; 6 |

=== Venezuela vs. Bahamas ===
Venezuela
5
Doral Park Country Club, Doral, United States
3–5 February 2017
Hard

Bahamas
0

| | | | 1 | 2 | 3 | 4 | 5 |
|---|---|---|---|---|---|---|---|
| 1 | (Venezuela) (The Bahamas) | Ricardo Rodríguez; Philip Wilbert Major | 6^{5} 7^{7} | 6; 1 | 6; 1 | 6; 1 |
| 2 | (Venezuela) (The Bahamas) | Luis David Martínez; Spencer Newman | 7; 5 | 6; 0 | 7^{7} 6^{5} |
| 3 | (Venezuela) (The Bahamas) | Luis David Martínez / Jordi Muñoz Abreu; Justin Lunn / Marvin Rolle | 6; 3 | 7; 5 | 6; 1 |
| 4 | (Venezuela) (The Bahamas) | Ricardo Rodríguez; Justin Lunn | 6; 0 | 6; 2 |
| 5 | (Venezuela) (The Bahamas) | Jordi Muñoz Abreu; Philip Wilbert Major | 6^{8} 7^{10} | 6; 4 | 6; 3 |

== Second round ==
=== Barbados vs. Guatemala ===
Barbados
3
National Tennis Centre, Saint Michael, Barbados
7–9 April
Hard

Guatemala
2

| | | | 1 | 2 | 3 | 4 | 5 |
|---|---|---|---|---|---|---|---|
| 1 | (Barbados) (Guatemala) | Adam Hornby; Christopher Díaz Figueroa | 5; 7 | 0; 6 | 2; 6 |
| 2 | (Barbados) (Guatemala) | Darian King; Luciano Ramazzini | 6; 2 | 6; 1 | 6; 1 |
| 3 | (Barbados) (Guatemala) | Darian King / Haydn Lewis; Christopher Díaz Figueroa / Wilfredo González | 6; 3 | 6; 4 | 6; 3 |
| 4 | (Barbados) (Guatemala) | Darian King; Christopher Díaz Figueroa | 6; 4 | 6; 3 | 6; 2 |
| 5 | (Barbados) (Guatemala) | Haydn Lewis; Wilfredo González | 5; 7 | 6; 4 | 6^{5} 7^{7} |

=== Venezuela vs. El Salvador ===
Venezuela
3
Doral Park Country Club, Doral, United States
7–9 April
Hard

El Salvador
2

| | | | 1 | 2 | 3 | 4 | 5 |
|---|---|---|---|---|---|---|---|---|
| 1 | (Venezuela) (El Salvador) | Jesús Bandres; Marcelo Arévalo | 2; 6 | 7^{7} 6^{4} | 3; 6 | 2; 6 |
| 2 | (Venezuela) (El Salvador) | Ricardo Rodríguez; Alberto Emmanuel Alvarado Larín | 6; 3 | 6; 1 | 6; 1 |
| 3 | (Venezuela) (El Salvador) | Luis David Martínez / Jordi Muñoz Abreu; Marcelo Arévalo / Rafael Arévalo | 6^{5} 7^{7} | 7; 5 | 4; 6 | 7; 5 | 6; 4 |
| 4 | (Venezuela) (El Salvador) | Ricardo Rodríguez; Marcelo Arévalo | 2; 6 | 2; 6 | 3; 6 |
| 5 | (Venezuela) (El Salvador) | Luis David Martínez; Rafael Arévalo | 6; 1 | 6; 1 | | | | retired |

== Play-offs ==
=== Mexico vs. Paraguay ===
Mexico
5
Polideportivo Metropolitano de Tenis, Zapopan, Mexico
7–9 April
Hard

Paraguay
0

| | | | 1 | 2 | 3 | 4 | 5 |
|---|---|---|---|---|---|---|---|---|
| 1 | (Mexico) (Paraguay) | Hans Hach; Ayed Zatar | 6; 3 | 4; 6 | 6; 4 | 3; 6 | 6; 3 |
| 2 | (Mexico) (Paraguay) | Manuel Sánchez; Juan Borba | 7; 5 | 6; 3 | 6; 1 |
| 3 | (Mexico) (Paraguay) | Santiago González / Luis Patiño; Juan Borba / Ayed Zatar | 6; 2 | 6; 2 | 6; 1 |
| 4 | (Mexico) (Paraguay) | Manuel Sánchez; Ayed Zatar | 6; 2 | 3; 0 | | | | retired |
| 5 | (Mexico) (Paraguay) | Hans Hach; Juan Borba | 6; 2 | 7^{8} 6^{6} |

=== Bolivia vs. Bahamas ===
Bolivia
4
Club de Tenis Santa Cruz, Santa Cruz de la Sierra, Bolivia
7–9 April
Clay

Bahamas
1

| | | | 1 | 2 | 3 | 4 | 5 |
|---|---|---|---|---|---|---|---|
| 1 | (Bolivia) (The Bahamas) | Hugo Dellien; Spencer Newman | 6; 2 | 6; 0 | 6; 2 |
| 2 | (Bolivia) (The Bahamas) | Federico Zeballos; Philip Wilbert Major | 6; 2 | 6; 2 | 6; 4 |
| 3 | (Bolivia) (The Bahamas) | Hugo Dellien / Federico Zeballos; Philip Wilbert Major / Marvin Rolle | 6^{5} 7^{7} | 6; 1 | 6; 0 | 6; 1 |
| 4 | (Bolivia) (The Bahamas) | Boris Arias; Spencer Newman | 5; 7 | 6; 3 | 4; 6 |
| 5 | (Bolivia) (The Bahamas) | Juan Carlos Manuel Aguilar; Justin Lunn | 6; 4 | 6; 3 |

== Third round ==
=== Barbados vs. Venezuela ===
Barbados
3
National Tennis Centre, Wildey, Barbados
15−19 September
Hard

Venezuela
2

| | | | 1 | 2 | 3 | 4 | 5 |
|---|---|---|---|---|---|---|---|---|
| 1 | (Barbados) (Venezuela) | Matthew Foster-Estwick; Ricardo Rodríguez | 1; 6 | 2; 6 | 1; 6 |
| 2 | (Barbados) (Venezuela) | Darian King; Jordi Muñoz Abreu | 6; 1 | 1; 0 | | | | retired |
| 3 | (Barbados) (Venezuela) | Darian King / Haydn Lewis; Luis David Martínez / Jordi Muñoz Abreu | 6^{0} 7^{7} | 6; 2 | 4; 6 | 6; 3 | 5; 7 |
| 4 | (Barbados) (Venezuela) | Darian King; Ricardo Rodríguez | 5; 7 | 7; 5 | 6; 2 | 6; 3 |
| 5 | (Barbados) (Venezuela) | Haydn Lewis; Luis David Martínez | 2; 6 | 6; 4 | 6; 3 | 6; 4 |
