= 2016 Davis Cup Americas Zone Group II =

International tennis competition

The Americas Zone is one of the three zones of the regional Davis Cup competition in 2016.

In the Americas Zone there are three different tiers, called groups, in which teams compete against each other to advance to the upper tier. Winners in Group II advance to the Americas Zone Group I. Teams who lose their respective ties will compete in the relegation play-offs, with winning teams remaining in Group II, whereas teams who lose their play-offs will be relegated to the Americas Zone Group III in 2017.

== Participating nations ==
Seeds:

1. Uruguay
2. Venezuela
3. Mexico
4. El Salvador

Remaining nations:

- Guatemala
- Paraguay
- Peru
- Puerto Rico

=== Draw ===
Play-offs
Guatemala City, Guatemala (hard)
1	Uruguay	1
Guatemala	4
Asunción, Paraguay (clay)
Puerto Rico	0
Paraguay	5

First Round
Lima, Peru (clay)
1	Uruguay	2
Peru	3
San Francisco de Campeche, MX (hard)
3	Mexico	3
Guatemala	2
Santa Tecla, El Salvador (hard)
Puerto Rico	2
4	El Salvador	3
Valencia, Venezuela (hard)
Paraguay	0
2	Venezuela	5

Second Round
Lima, Peru (clay)
Peru	4
3	Mexico	1
Santa Tecla, El Salvador (hard)
4	El Salvador	2
2	Venezuela	3

Third Round
Lima, Peru (clay)
Peru	3
2	Venezuela	2

- Uruguay and Puerto Rico relegated to Group III in 2017.
- Peru promoted to Group I in 2017.

== First round ==
=== Peru vs. Uruguay ===
Peru
3
Club Tennis Las Terrazas Miraflores, Lima, Peru
4–6 March 2016
Clay

Uruguay
2

			1	2	3	4	5
1	(Peru) (Uruguay)	Jorge Panta; Martín Cuevas	7; 5	6^{5} 7^{7}	7^{7} 6^{5}	6; 4
2	(Peru) (Uruguay)	Mauricio Echazú; Santiago Maresca	6^{5} 7^{7}	6; 1	6; 2	6; 1
3	(Peru) (Uruguay)	Duilio Vallebuona / Juan Pablo Varillas; Ariel Behar / Martín Cuevas	4; 6	6^{3} 7^{7}	5; 7
4	(Peru) (Uruguay)	Mauricio Echazú; Martín Cuevas	5; 7	1; 6	4; 6
5	(Peru) (Uruguay)	Juan Pablo Varillas; Rodrigo Arús	5; 7	5; 7	6; 1	6; 4	6; 2

=== Mexico vs. Guatemala ===
Mexico
3
Juan Camilo Mouriño Terrazo Stadium, San Francisco de Campeche, Mexico
4–6 March 2016
Hard

Guatemala
2

			1	2	3	4	5
1	(Mexico) (Guatemala)	Lucas Gómez; Wilfredo González	6; 4	3; 6	6; 2	6; 2
2	(Mexico) (Guatemala)	Hans Hach; Christopher Díaz Figueroa	7^{7} 6^{5}	6^{2} 7^{7}	4; 6	6; 3	6; 2
3	(Mexico) (Guatemala)	Santiago González / Miguel Ángel Reyes-Varela; Christopher Díaz Figueroa / Wilfredo González	6; 1	7^{9} 6^{7}	6; 3
4	(Mexico) (Guatemala)	Lucas Gómez; Christopher Díaz Figueroa	2; 6	2; 6
5	(Mexico) (Guatemala)	Hans Hach; Wilfredo González	3; 6	2; 6

=== El Salvador vs. Puerto Rico ===
El Salvador
3
Complejo Polideportivo de Ciudad Merliot, Santa Tecla, El Salvador
4–6 March 2016
Hard

Puerto Rico
2

			1	2	3	4	5
1	(El Salvador) (Puerto Rico)	Alberto Emmanuel Alvarado Larin; Sebastián Arcila	4; 6	4; 6	2; 6
2	(El Salvador) (Puerto Rico)	Marcelo Arévalo; Alex Díaz	6; 2	6; 2	6; 0
3	(El Salvador) (Puerto Rico)	Marcelo Arévalo / Rafael Arévalo; Sebastián Arcila / Alex Díaz	6^{6} 7^{8}	6; 2	6; 2	6; 3
4	(El Salvador) (Puerto Rico)	Marcelo Arévalo; Sebastián Arcila	6; 2	7; 5	6; 1
5	(El Salvador) (Puerto Rico)	Sebastián Quirós; Ignacio García	1; 6	2; 6

=== Venezuela vs. Paraguay ===
Venezuela
5
Cancha José Ignacio Colell, Valencia, Venezuela
4–6 March 2016
Hard

Paraguay
0

			1	2	3	4	5
1	(Venezuela) (Paraguay)	Ricardo Rodríguez; Bruno Brítez	6^{8} 7^{10}	7; 5	6; 1	7; 5
2	(Venezuela) (Paraguay)	Luis David Martínez; Ayed Zatar	7; 5	3; 6	7^{9} 6^{7}	6; 4
3	(Venezuela) (Paraguay)	Luis David Martínez / Roberto Maytín; Bruno Brítez / Ayed Zatar	6; 2	6; 2	6; 4
4	(Venezuela) (Paraguay)	Ricardo Rodríguez; Francisco Yim Kim	6; 1	6; 0
5	(Venezuela) (Paraguay)	Miguel Ángel Este; Hernando José Escurra Isnardi	6; 3	6; 3

== Second round ==
=== Peru vs. Mexico ===
Peru
4
Club Tennis Las Terrazas Miraflores, Lima, Peru
15–17 July 2016
Clay

Mexico
1

			1	2	3	4	5
1	(Peru) (Mexico)	Mauricio Echazú; Luis Patiño	5; 7	6; 4	6; 4	7^{7} 6^{3}
2	(Peru) (Mexico)	Nicolás Álvarez; Lucas Gómez	6; 3	6; 4	6; 3
3	(Peru) (Mexico)	Jorge Panta / Juan Pablo Varillas; Santiago González / Miguel Ángel Reyes-Varela	3; 6	1; 6	3; 6
4	(Peru) (Mexico)	Mauricio Echazú; Lucas Gómez	6; 2	6; 4	6; 3
5	(Peru) (Mexico)	Nicolás Álvarez; Luis Patiño	6; 4	6^{2} 7^{7}	6; 3

=== El Salvador vs. Venezuela ===
El Salvador
2
Complejo Polideportivo de Ciudad Merliot, Santa Tecla, El Salvador
15–17 July 2016
Hard

Venezuela
3

			1	2	3	4	5
1	(El Salvador) (Venezuela)	Marcelo Arévalo; Jordi Muñoz Abreu	6; 1	6; 1	7; 5
2	(El Salvador) (Venezuela)	Alejandro González; Ricardo Rodríguez	2; 6	0; 6	1; 6
3	(El Salvador) (Venezuela)	Marcelo Arévalo / Rafael Arévalo; Luis David Martínez / Roberto Maytín	4; 6	6; 3	3; 6	6^{4} 7^{7}
4	(El Salvador) (Venezuela)	Marcelo Arévalo; Ricardo Rodríguez	6; 1	6; 2	6; 4
5	(El Salvador) (Venezuela)	Rafael Arévalo; Luis David Martínez	1; 6	5; 7	5; 7

== Play-offs ==
=== Guatemala vs. Uruguay ===
Guatemala
4
Federación Nacional de Tenis de Campo, Guatemala City, Guatemala
15–17 July 2016
Hard

Uruguay
1

			1	2	3	4	5
1	(Guatemala) (Uruguay)	Christopher Díaz Figueroa; Rodrigo Arus	7; 5	6; 2	6; 4
2	(Guatemala) (Uruguay)	Wilfredo González; Martín Cuevas	7; 5	7^{7} 6^{2}	6; 3
3	(Guatemala) (Uruguay)	Christopher Díaz Figueroa / Wilfredo González; Martín Cuevas / Marcel Felder	4; 6	6; 3	3; 6	6; 3	6^{9} 7^{11}
4	(Guatemala) (Uruguay)	Christopher Díaz Figueroa; Martín Cuevas	3; 6	6; 1	3; 6	6; 4	6; 2
5	(Guatemala) (Uruguay)	Rudy Richter; Santiago Maresca	7^{7} 6^{4}	7^{10} 6^{8}

=== Paraguay vs. Puerto Rico ===
Paraguay
5
Court Central Victor Manuel Pecci del Club Internacional de Tenis, Asunción, Paraguay
15–17 July 2016
Clay

Puerto Rico
0

			1	2	3	4	5
1	(Paraguay) (Puerto Rico)	Ayed Zatar; Sebastián Arcila	6; 3	4; 6	6; 3	6; 1
2	(Paraguay) (Puerto Rico)	Diego Galeano; Alex Díaz	6; 3	6; 1	6; 1
3	(Paraguay) (Puerto Rico)	Diego Galeano / Ayed Zatar; Sebastián Arcila / Alex Díaz	6; 2	6; 2	6; 2
4	(Paraguay) (Puerto Rico)	Bruno Britez; Sebastián Arcila	6; 1	6; 4
5	(Paraguay) (Puerto Rico)	Juan Borba; Ignacio García	6; 1	6; 4

== Third round ==
=== Peru vs. Venezuela ===
Peru
3
Club Tennis Las Terrazas Miraflores, Lima, Peru
16–18 September 2016
Clay

Venezuela
2

			1	2	3	4	5
1	(Peru) (Venezuela)	Mauricio Echazú; Jordi Muñoz Abreu	6; 3	6; 1	2; 6	6; 2
2	(Peru) (Venezuela)	Nicolás Álvarez; Ricardo Rodríguez	6; 4	6; 2	6; 0
3	(Peru) (Venezuela)	Jorge Panta / Juan Pablo Varillas; Luis David Martínez / Roberto Maytín	4; 6	6; 2	6; 3	3; 6	1; 6
4	(Peru) (Venezuela)	Mauricio Echazú; Ricardo Rodríguez	6; 2	4; 6	3; 6	3; 6
5	(Peru) (Venezuela)	Nicolás Álvarez; Luis David Martínez	4; 6	6; 4	7^{7} 6^{2}	6; 1
