= Marcelo Arévalo =

Salvadoran tennis player (born 1990)

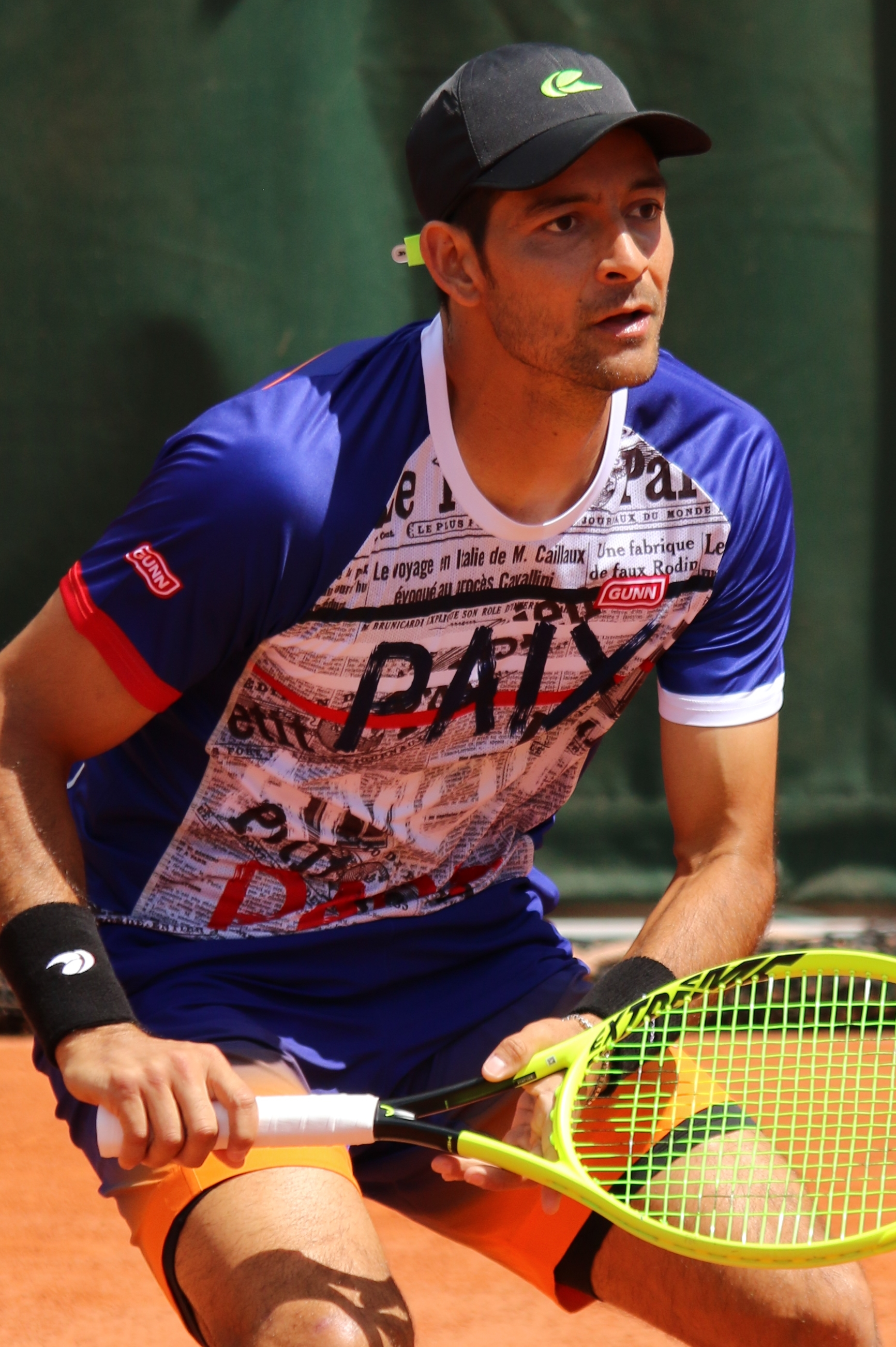
- Arévalo at the 2019 French Open
- Full name: Marcelo Arévalo González
- Country (sports): El Salvador
- Residence: San Salvador, El Salvador
- Born: October 17, 1990 (age 36) Sonsonate, El Salvador
- Height: 1.93 m (6 ft 4 in)
- Turned pro: 2012
- Plays: Right-handed (two-handed backhand)
- College: Tulsa
- Coach: Yari Bernardo; Carlos Teixeira
- Prize money: US $6,595,669

Singles
- Career record: 36–23
- Career titles: 0
- Highest ranking: No. 139 (2 July 2018)

Grand Slam singles results
- Australian Open: Q2 (2017, 2019)
- French Open: Q2 (2018)
- Wimbledon: Q2 (2016)
- US Open: Q2 (2018)

Doubles
- Career record: 288–173
- Career titles: 17
- Highest ranking: No. 1 (11 November 2024)
- Current ranking: No. 8 (21 September 2026)

Grand Slam doubles results
- Australian Open: QF (2020, 2021, 2023, 2025, 2026)
- French Open: W (2022, 2024)
- Wimbledon: F (2026)
- US Open: SF (2022, 2024)

Other doubles tournaments
- Tour Finals: F (2024, 2026)

Grand Slam mixed doubles results
- Australian Open: SF (2026)
- French Open: SF (2025)
- Wimbledon: W (2026)
- US Open: F (2021)

Team competitions
- Davis Cup: 50–31
Medal record
Central American and Caribbean Games
Bronze medal – third place	2010 Mayagüez	Singles
- Last updated on: 22 November 2026.

Marcelo Arévalo González (Latin American Spanish: [maɾˈselo aˈɾeβalo ɣonˈsales]; (Note: In isolation, González is pronounced [ɡonˈsales].) born October 17, 1990) is a Salvadoran professional tennis player. He has been ranked world No. 1 in doubles by the ATP, achieved on 11 November 2024, and has a career-high singles ranking of No. 139, attained in April 2018, making him the highest-ranked Salvadoran player, male or female, across both disciplines in tennis history. In December 2024, Arévalo was named El Salvador's Male Sportsman of the Year.

Arévalo has won 17 ATP Tour–level doubles titles, including three majors: two in men's doubles at the 2022 French Open partnering Jean-Julien Rojer, and the 2024 French Open partnering Mate Pavić, and one in mixed doubles at the 2026 Wimbledon Championships partnering Jeļena Ostapenko. He is the first player from Central America to claim a men's doubles major title. He also contested another major final, finishing runner-up at the 2021 US Open mixed doubles event partnering Giuliana Olmos.

As a junior, Arévalo was ranked as high as No. 8 in the world and won seven singles and doubles titles on the ITF Junior Circuit. As a professional, he broke into the top 100 in doubles in 2018 and won his first ATP title at the 2018 Los Cabos Open with Miguel Ángel Reyes-Varela, making his debut in the top 50. After several years with intermittent partners, Arévalo formed a new partnership with Rojer in 2022 that took them to four additional tour finals, three of which they won, and helped him debut in the top 10.

== Personal life ==
Arévalo is married to Lucia and has two young sons, one of whom (Marcelito) joined him on court following his success in the mixed doubles final in 2026.

He is the younger brother of former tennis player Rafael Arévalo, who he often partnered with to represent El Salvador together in the Davis Cup.

== Professional career ==
=== 2018: First ATP title and top 50 in doubles ===
As a professional, Arévalo emerged into the top 100 of the doubles rankings in February 2018. He won his first ATP title six months later at the Los Cabos Open, a victory that propelled him into the top 50.

=== 2021: Second career title, first mixed doubles final ===
2021 was the most successful year on the ATP tour in Arevalo's professional doubles career. He reached in the end of March the quarterfinals in the 2021 Miami Open with Horia Tecău defeating the top seeded pair of Farah/Cabal.

With his Dutch partner Matwé Middelkoop, the pair reached the quarterfinals of the Australian Open (his second in a row) and the semifinals of the Italian Open as alternates, defeating home favorites Fognini/Musetti in the round of 16 and 7th seeded Dutch pair Koolhof/Rojer in the quarterfinals. As a result he returned to the top 50 in the doubles rankings at a career-high ranking of World No. 42 on 17 May 2021.

Again as an alternate pair with Fabio Fognini, Arevalo reached the semifinals of the Cincinnati Open where they were defeated by No. 2 seeded pair Zeballos/Granollers. As a result, he reached a new career-high ranking of world No. 39 on 23 August 2021.

At the Winston-Salem Open, Arévalo won the title partnering Matwé Middelkoop when they defeated Ivan Dodig and Austin Krajicek in the final. This was his first title in over three years and second of his career. As a result he reached a new career-high ranking of World No. 36 on 30 August 2021.

At the US Open, following a first round loss in the men's doubles draw, Arévalo partnered Giuliana Olmos in the mixed doubles draw and reached the final by defeating top seeds Nicole Melichar-Martinez and Ivan Dodig en route. They lost to second seeded pair Desirae Krawczyk and Joe Salisbury in straight sets. Arevalo became the first player from El Salvador to reach a Grand Slam final.

=== 2022–23: Historic Major and Masters doubles titles, World No. 5 ===
After wrapping 2021 with Middelkoop, Arévalo joined with Jean-Julien Rojer for a new doubles partnership for the 2022 season. Arevalo reached the top 30 on 17 January 2022. With no title wins during the Australian swing, they moved onto the inaugural Dallas Open in February as the top seeds, where they clinched their first title together as a team without dropping a set after defeating Lloyd Glasspool and Harri Heliövaara. The pair carried their momentum into the following week as the top seeds at the Delray Beach Open and they sealed their second consecutive title together, having dropped just one set in the championship match to Aleksandr Nedovyesov and Aisam-ul-Haq Qureshi. Arevalo reached the top 25 on 21 February 2022. Their winning streak extended yet another week as they reached their third consecutive final and their biggest one as a team thus far, the ATP 500 in Acapulco, but they were halted in straight sets by Feliciano López and Stefanos Tsitsipas. Although the team started off their European clay swing strongly by reaching the semifinals in Monte Carlo and Barcelona, they did not make a final.

At the French Open, seeded twelfth, Arévalo and Roger reached their first Grand Slam championship match together to vie for their first Major title as a team, defeating 16th seeds Rohan Bopanna and Matwé Middelkoop also first time semifinalists. In the final, they faced Ivan Dodig and Austin Krajicek, who, after winning the first set in a tiebreak, had three championship points on Rojer's serve in the second set. But after Arévalo and Rojer saved those decisive points and closed the second set in another tiebreak, they went on to convert their first break point opportunity in the third set and continued to hold serve to seal off the match for their third victory of the season. Arévalo's first Grand Slam win made him the first player from Central America to become a men's doubles major champion. As a result, he moved onto the top 10 in the rankings on 13 June 2022. The pair won their fourth title as a team at the 2022 Stockholm Open. He reached a new career-high of World No. 5 on 14 November 2022.

At the 2023 Canadian Open, the Arévalo and Roger won their seventh title together and first Masters 1000 defeating Rajeev Ram and Joe Salisbury.

=== 2024: Consecutive French Open title, ATP Finals runner-up, World No. 1 ===
With new partner Mate Pavić, Arévalo defeated Simone Bolelli and Andrea Vavassori in the final, 7–5, 6–3 to win title at the 2024 French Open. It was Arévalo's second major men's doubles title and Pavić's fourth. Pavić completed a career Golden Slam with the win, having previously won the three other Grand Slams and an Olympic gold medal.

At the 2024 Cincinnati Open he won his second Masters title with Mate Pavić, defeating Alex Michelsen and Mackenzie McDonald. On 28 August 2024, Arévalo and Pavic became the first doubles team to qualify for the 2024 ATP Finals.

On 11 November 2024, he became the world No. 1 player in doubles jointly with his partner Mate Pavić. The duo also clinched the year-end ATP No. 1 doubles team ranking. They reached the final with a straight set defeat over Harri Heliövaara and Henry Patten. They lost to the German duo Kevin Krawietz and Tim Pütz in the final.

=== 2025: Sunshine Double champion ===
Marcelo Arévalo and Mate Pavić won the Indian Wells Masters becoming the first World No. 1 pair to accomplish the feat since the Bryan Brothers in 2014, defeating Sebastian Korda and Jordan Thompson. They won the next Sunshine Double Masters in Miami and became only the sixth team in history to accomplish the feat.

=== 2026: Wimbledon mixed doubles title ===
In June at the Queen's Club Championships, Arévalo and Pavić won the title, defeating top seeds Harri Heliövaara and Henry Patten in the final. The following month he teamed up with Jeļena Ostapenko to win the mixed doubles title at Wimbledon, overcoming the Australian pairing of Marc Polmans and Storm Hunter in the final and becoming the first Wimbledon champion from El Salvador in the process. Alongside Pavić, he also reached the final of men's doubles but they lost to Patten and Heliovaara in straight sets.

== World TeamTennis ==
Arevalo made his World TeamTennis debut in 2020 by joining the Washington Kastles when the WTT season began July 12 at The Greenbrier.

== Performance timeline ==
Key
W	F	SF	QF	#R	RR	Q#	DNQ	A	NH

(W) winner; (F) finalist; (SF) semifinalist; (QF) quarterfinalist; (#R) rounds 4, 3, 2, 1; (RR) round-robin stage; (Q#) qualification round; (DNQ) did not qualify; (A) absent; (NH) not held; (SR) strike rate (events won / competed); (W–L) win–loss record.
To avoid confusion and double counting, these charts are updated at the conclusion of a tournament or when the player's participation has ended.

=== Doubles ===
Tournament	2015	2016	2017	2018	2019	2020	2021	2022	2023	2024	2025	2026	SR	W–L	Win%
Grand Slam tournaments
Australian Open	A	A	A	A	2R	QF	QF	1R	QF	3R	QF	QF	0 / 8	18–8	69%
French Open	A	A	A	3R	1R	2R	3R	W	QF	W	3R	3R	2 / 9	24–6	80%
Wimbledon	A	1R	A	2R	2R	NH	A	1R	2R	QF	SF	F	0 / 8	14-8	64%
US Open	A	A	A	1R	3R	1R	1R	SF	3R	SF	2R		0 / 8	13–8	62%
Win–loss	0–0	0–1	0–0	3–3	4–4	4–3	5–3	10–3	9–4	15–3	10–4		2 / 33	69-30	70%
Year–end championships
ATP Finals	Did not qualify							RR	DNQ	F	RR		0 / 3	5–6	45%
ATP Masters 1000
Indian Wells Masters	A	A	A	A	A	NH	2R	2R	1R	2R	W	1R	1 / 6	8–5	62%
Miami Open	A	A	A	A	A	NH	QF	1R	1R	2R	W	QF	1 / 6	10 –5	67%
Monte-Carlo Masters	A	A	A	A	A	NH	A	SF	QF	SF	SF	F	0 / 5	12–5	71%
Madrid Open	A	A	A	A	A	NH	A	A (Note: Planned for playing alongside Jean-Julien Rojer but they withdrew in the last minute. As a result, no alternates were chosen.)	SF	2R	F	QF	0 / 4	9–4	69%
Italian Open	A	A	A	A	A	A	SF	1R	1R	F	W	QF	1 / 6	14–5	74%
Canadian Open	A	A	A	A	A	NH	A	QF	W	SF	QF		1 / 4	9–3	75%
Cincinnati Masters	A	A	A	A	A	A	SF	QF	2R	W	QF		1 / 5	11–4	73%
Shanghai Masters	A	A	A	A	A	NH			QF	1R	SF		0 / 3	5–3	63%
Paris Masters	A	A	A	A	A	2R	A	2R	2R	2R	A		0 / 4	1–4	20%
Win–loss	0–0	0–0	0–0	0–0	0–0	1–1	9–4	5–7	12–8	15–8	28–5		5 / 38	69–33	68%
Career Statistics
Titles	0	0	0	1	0	0	1	4	3	4	3	1	17		
Finals	0	0	0	2	1	1	1	5	3	5	4	3	22		
Year-end Ranking	190	119	110	54	71	52	31	6	19	1	7		$6,595,669		

=== Mixed doubles ===
Tournament	2021	2022	2023	2024	2025	2026	SR	W–L
Australian Open	A	2R	2R	1R	2R	SF	0 / 5	6–5
French Open	A	1R	QF	QF	SF	1R	0 / 5	10–5
Wimbledon	A	1R	QF	1R	SF	W	1 / 5	10–4
US Open	F	1R	2R	1R	A		0 / 4	5–4
Win–loss	4–1	1–4	6–4	2–4	7–3	10-2	0 / 19	31-18

== Grand Slam tournament finals ==
=== Doubles: 3 (2 titles, 1 runner-up) ===
Result	Year	Tournament	Surface	Partner	Opponents	Score
Win	2022	French Open	Clay	(Netherlands) Jean-Julien Rojer	(Croatia) Ivan Dodig (United States) Austin Krajicek	6–7^{(4–7)}, 7–6^{(7–5)}, 6–3
Win	2024	French Open (2)	Clay	(Croatia) Mate Pavić	(Italy) Simone Bolelli (Italy) Andrea Vavassori	7–5, 6–3
Loss	2026	Wimbledon	Grass	(Croatia) Mate Pavić	(Finland) Harri Heliövaara (United Kingdom) Henry Patten	6–7^{(4–7)}, 6–7^{(3–7)}

=== Mixed doubles: 2 (1 title, 1 runner-up) ===
Result	Year	Tournament	Surface	Partner	Opponents	Score
Loss	2021	US Open	Hard	(Mexico) Giuliana Olmos	(United States) Desirae Krawczyk (United Kingdom) Joe Salisbury	5–7, 2–6
Win	2026	Wimbledon	Grass	(Latvia) Jeļena Ostapenko	(Australia) Storm Hunter (Australia) Marc Polmans	4–6, 7–5, 6–2

== Other significant finals ==
=== Year-end championships ===
==== Doubles: 2 (2 runner-ups) ====
Result	Year	Tournament	Surface	Partner	Opponents	Score
Loss	2024	ATP Finals, Italy	Hard (i)	(Croatia) Mate Pavić	(Germany) Kevin Krawietz (Germany) Tim Pütz	6–7^{(5–7)}, 6–7^{(6–8)}
Loss	2026	ATP Finals, Italy	Hard (i)	(Croatia) Mate Pavić	(France) Théo Arribagé (France) Albano Olivetti	6–3, 6–7^{(2–7)}, [6–10]

=== Masters 1000 tournaments ===
==== Doubles: 9 (5 titles, 4 runner-ups) ====
Result	Year	Tournament	Surface	Partner	Opponents	Score
Win	2023	Canadian Open	Hard	(Netherlands) Jean-Julien Rojer	(United States) Rajeev Ram (United Kingdom) Joe Salisbury	6–3, 6–1
Loss	2024	Italian Open	Clay	(Croatia) Mate Pavić	(Spain) Marcel Granollers (Argentina) Horacio Zeballos	2–6, 2–6
Win	2024	Cincinnati Open	Hard	(Croatia) Mate Pavić	(United States) Mackenzie McDonald (United States) Alex Michelsen	6–2, 6–4
Win	2025	Indian Wells Open	Hard	(Croatia) Mate Pavić	(United States) Sebastian Korda (Australia) Jordan Thompson	6–3, 6–4
Win	2025	Miami Open	Hard	(Croatia) Mate Pavić	(United Kingdom) Julian Cash (United Kingdom) Lloyd Glasspool	7–6^{(7–3)}, 6–3
Loss	2025	Madrid Open	Clay	(Croatia) Mate Pavić	(Spain) Marcel Granollers (Argentina) Horacio Zeballos	4–6, 4–6
Win	2025	Italian Open	Clay	(Croatia) Mate Pavić	(France) Sadio Doumbia (France) Fabien Reboul	6–4, 6–7^{(6–8)}, [13–11]
Loss	2026	Monte-Carlo Masters	Clay	(Croatia) Mate Pavić	(Germany) Kevin Krawietz (Germany) Tim Pütz	6–4, 2–6, [8–10]
Loss	2026	Canadian Open	Hard	(Croatia) Mate Pavić	(Brazil) Orlando Luz (Brazil) Rafael Matos	7−5, 4−6, [6−10]

== ATP Tour finals ==
=== Doubles: 29 (17 titles, 12 runner-ups) ===
Legend Grand Slam (2–1) ATP Finals (0–2) ATP 1000 (5–4) ATP 500 (1–2) ATP 250 (9–3)	Finals by surface Hard (12–5) Clay (4–4) Grass (1–3)	Finals by setting Outdoor (15–10) Indoor (2–2)

Result	W–L	Date	Tournament	Tier	Surface	Partner	Opponents	Score
Loss	0–1	Jul 2018	Hall of Fame Championships, US	250 Series	Grass	(Mexico) Miguel Ángel Reyes-Varela	(Israel) Jonathan Erlich (New Zealand) Artem Sitak	1–6, 2–6
Win	1–1	Aug 2018	Los Cabos Open, Mexico	250 Series	Hard	(Mexico) Miguel Ángel Reyes-Varela	(United States) Taylor Fritz (Australia) Thanasi Kokkinakis	6–4, 6–4
Loss	1–2	Jul 2019	Hall of Fame Championships, US	250 Series	Grass	(Mexico) Miguel Ángel Reyes-Varela	(Spain) Marcel Granollers (Ukraine) Sergiy Stakhovsky	7–6^{(12–10)}, 4–6, [11–13]
Loss	1–3	Feb 2020	Chile Open, Chile	250 Series	Clay	(United Kingdom) Jonny O'Mara	(Spain) Roberto Carballés Baena (Spain) Alejandro Davidovich Fokina	6–7^{(3–7)}, 1–6
Win	2–3	Aug 2021	Winston-Salem Open, US	250 Series	Hard	(Netherlands) Matwé Middelkoop	(Croatia) Ivan Dodig (United States) Austin Krajicek	6–7^{(5–7)}, 7–5, [10–6]
Win	3–3	Feb 2022	Dallas Open, US	250 Series	Hard (i)	(Netherlands) Jean-Julien Rojer	(United Kingdom) Lloyd Glasspool (Finland) Harri Heliövaara	7–6^{(7–4)}, 6–4
Win	4–3	Feb 2022	Delray Beach Open, US	250 Series	Hard	(Netherlands) Jean-Julien Rojer	(Kazakhstan) Aleksandr Nedovyesov (Pakistan) Aisam-ul-Haq Qureshi	6–2, 6–7^{(5–7)}, [10–4]
Loss	4–4	Feb 2022	Mexican Open, Mexico	500 Series	Hard	(Netherlands) Jean-Julien Rojer	(Spain) Feliciano López (Greece) Stefanos Tsitsipas	5–7, 4–6
Win	5–4	Jun 2022	French Open, France	Grand Slam	Clay	(Netherlands) Jean-Julien Rojer	(Croatia) Ivan Dodig (United States) Austin Krajicek	6–7^{(4–7)}, 7–6^{(7–5)}, 6–3
Win	6–4	Oct 2022	Stockholm Open, Sweden	250 Series	Hard (i)	(Netherlands) Jean-Julien Rojer	(United Kingdom) Lloyd Glasspool (Finland) Harri Heliövaara	6–3, 6–3
Win	7–4	Jan 2023	Adelaide International 2, Australia	250 Series	Hard	(Netherlands) Jean-Julien Rojer	(Croatia) Ivan Dodig (United States) Austin Krajicek	Walkover
Win	8–4	Feb 2023	Delray Beach Open, US (2)	250 Series	Hard	(Netherlands) Jean-Julien Rojer	(Australia) Rinky Hijikata (United States) Reese Stalder	6–3, 6–4
Win	9–4	Aug 2023	Canadian Open, Canada	Masters 1000	Hard	(Netherlands) Jean-Julien Rojer	(United States) Rajeev Ram (United Kingdom) Joe Salisbury	6–3, 6–1
Win	10–4	Jan 2024	Hong Kong Open, China	250 Series	Hard	(Croatia) Mate Pavić	(Belgium) Sander Gillé (Belgium) Joran Vliegen	7–6^{(7–3)}, 6–4
Loss	10–5	May 2024	Italian Open, Italy	Masters 1000	Clay	(Croatia) Mate Pavić	(Spain) Marcel Granollers (Argentina) Horacio Zeballos	2–6, 2–6
Win	11–5	May 2024	Geneva Open, Switzerland	250 Series	Clay	(Croatia) Mate Pavić	(Netherlands) Jean-Julien Rojer (United Kingdom) Lloyd Glasspool	7–6^{(7–2)}, 7–5
Win	12–5	Jun 2024	French Open, France (2)	Grand Slam	Clay	(Croatia) Mate Pavić	(Italy) Simone Bolelli (Italy) Andrea Vavassori	7–5, 6–3
Win	13–5	Aug 2024	Cincinnati Open, US	Masters 1000	Hard	(Croatia) Mate Pavić	(United States) Mackenzie McDonald (United States) Alex Michelsen	6–2, 6–4
Loss	13–6	Nov 2024	ATP Finals, Italy	Finals	Hard (i)	(Croatia) Mate Pavić	(Germany) Kevin Krawietz (Germany) Tim Pütz	6–7^{(5–7)}, 6–7^{(6–8)}
Win	14–6	Mar 2025	Indian Wells Open, US	Masters 1000	Hard	(Croatia) Mate Pavić	(United States) Sebastian Korda (Australia) Jordan Thompson	6–3, 6–4
Win	15–6	Mar 2025	Miami Open, US	Masters 1000	Hard	(Croatia) Mate Pavić	(United Kingdom) Julian Cash (United Kingdom) Lloyd Glasspool	7–6^{(7–3)}, 6–3
Loss	15–7	May 2025	Madrid Open, Spain	Masters 1000	Clay	(Croatia) Mate Pavić	(Spain) Marcel Granollers (Argentina) Horacio Zeballos	4–6, 4–6
Win	16–7	May 2025	Italian Open, Italy	Masters 1000	Clay	(Croatia) Mate Pavić	(France) Sadio Doumbia (France) Fabien Reboul	6–4, 6–7(6–8), [13–11]
Loss	16–8	Feb 2026	Dubai Tennis Championships, UAE	500 Series	Hard	(Croatia) Mate Pavić	(Finland) Harri Heliövaara (United Kingdom) Henry Patten	5–7, 5–7
Loss	16–9	Apr 2026	Monte-Carlo Masters, Monaco	Masters 1000	Clay	(Croatia) Mate Pavić	(Germany) Kevin Krawietz (Germany) Tim Pütz	6–4, 2–6, [8–10]
Win	17–9	Jun 2026	Queen's Club Championships, UK	500 Series	Grass	(Croatia) Mate Pavić	(Finland) Harri Heliövaara (United Kingdom) Henry Patten	6–2, 6–4
Loss	17–10	Jul 2026	Wimbledon Championships, UK	Grand Slam	Grass	(Croatia) Mate Pavić	(Finland) Harri Heliövaara (United Kingdom) Henry Patten	6–7^{(4–7)}, 6–7^{(3–7)}
Loss	17–11	Aug 2026	Canadian Open, Canada	Masters 1000	Hard	(Croatia) Mate Pavić	(Brazil) Orlando Luz (Brazil) Rafael Matos	7–5, 4−6, [6−10]
Loss	17–12	Nov 2026	ATP Finals, Italy	Finals	Hard (i)	(Croatia) Mate Pavić	(France) Théo Arribagé (France) Albano Olivetti	6–3, 6−7^{(2–7)}, [6−10]

== ATP Challenger and ITF Tour finals ==
=== Singles: 25 (14–11) ===
Legend ATP Challenger (3–3) ITF Futures (11–8)	Finals by surface Hard (7–5) Clay (7–6) Grass (0–0)

Result	W–L	Date	Tournament	Tier	Surface	Opponent	Score
Loss	0–1	May 2009	Mexico F6, Guadalajara	Futures	Clay	(Mexico) Miguel Gallardo Valles	5–7, 7–5, 3–6
Win	1–1	Nov 2009	Mexico F15, Puerto Vallarta	Futures	Hard	(Moldova) Roman Borvanov	6–3, 6–3
Win	2–1	Nov 2009	El Salvador F2, Santa Tecla	Futures	Clay	(Greece) Alexandros Jakupovic	7–6^{(7–2)}, 6–2
Loss	2–2	Feb 2012	Panama F1, Panama City	Futures	Clay	(Spain) Sergio Gutiérrez Ferrol	4–6, 1–6
Win	3–2	May 2012	Mexico F8, Puebla	Futures	Hard	(France) Antoine Benneteau	7–6^{(7–5)}, 5–7, 6–2
Win	4–2	May 2012	Peru F4, Arequipa	Futures	Clay	(Brazil) Marcelo Demoliner	6–4, 7–5
Loss	4–3	Sep 2012	Mexico F10, Manzanillo	Futures	Hard	(United States) Adam El Mihdawy	6–7^{(2–7)}, 2–6
Loss	4–4	Nov 2012	Mexico F15, Mazatlán	Futures	Hard	(Colombia) Michael Quintero	1–6, 7–6^{(7–4)}, 0–1 ret.
Loss	4–5	Feb 2013	Mexico F3, Mexico City	Futures	Hard	(Japan) Yoshihito Nishioka	2–6, 6–7^{(4–7)}
Win	5–5	Jun 2013	USA F14, Innisbrook	Futures	Clay	(Brazil) Fernando Romboli	6–3, 7–6^{(7–5)}
Win	6–5	Aug 2014	Colombia F3, Medellín	Futures	Clay	(Colombia) Juan Carlos Spir	7–6^{(7–2)}, 6–4
Loss	6–6	Aug 2014	Colombia F4, Medellín	Futures	Clay	(Dominican Republic) José Hernández-Fernández	5–7, 2–6
Win	7–6	Feb 2015	Guatemala F1, Guatemala City	Futures	Hard	(Guatemala) Christopher Díaz Figueroa	6–3, 6–1
Loss	7–7	Feb 2015	El Salvador F1, Santa Tecla	Futures	Clay	(Venezuela) David Souto	1–6, 2–6
Loss	7–8	Nov 2015	El Salvador F2, La Libertad	Futures	Hard	(Barbados) Darian King	6–7^{(6–8)}, 4–6
Win	8–8	Nov 2015	Guatemala F2, Guatemala City	Futures	Hard	(Colombia) Juan Sebastián Gómez	6–2, 5–7, 6–3
Win	9–8	Dec 2015	Honduras F1, San Pedro Sula	Futures	Hard	(Guatemala) Christopher Díaz Figueroa	Walkover
Loss	9–9	Mar 2016	San Luis Potosí, Mexico	Challenger	Clay	(Serbia) Peđa Krstin	4–6, 2–6
Loss	9–10	Aug 2016	Granby, Canada	Challenger	Hard	(United States) Frances Tiafoe	1–6, 1–6
Win	10–10	Nov 2016	El Salvador F1, San Salvador	Futures	Hard	(Zimbabwe) Benjamin Lock	6–2, 6–3
Win	11–10	Nov 2016	El Salvador F2, La Libertad	Futures	Clay	(Brazil) Bruno Sant'Anna	6–1, 6–2
Win	12–10	Sep 2017	Bogotá, Colombia	Challenger	Clay	(Colombia) Daniel Elahi Galán	7–5, 6–4
Loss	12–11	Nov 2017	Santiago, Chile	Challenger	Clay	(Chile) Nicolás Jarry	1–6, 5–7
Win	13–11	Apr 2018	San Luis Potosí, Mexico	Challenger	Clay	(Dominican Republic) Roberto Cid Subervi	6–3, 6–7^{(3–7)}, 6–4
Win	14–11	Apr 2018	Guadalajara, Mexico	Challenger	Hard	(United States) Christopher Eubanks	6–4, 5–7, 7–6^{(7–4)}

=== Doubles: 59 (35–24) ===
Legend ATP Challenger (17–11) ITF Futures (18–13)	Finals by surface Hard (18–10) Clay (17–14) Grass (0–0)

Result	W–L	Date	Tournament	Tier	Surface	Partner	Opponents	Score
Loss	0–1	Aug 2009	Venezuela F6, Caracas	Futures	Hard	(Guatemala) Christopher Díaz Figueroa	(Colombia) Michael Quintero (Venezuela) Yohny Romero	3–6, 6–7^{(5–7)}
Loss	0–2	Aug 2009	Ecuador F2, Guayaquil	Futures	Clay	(Guatemala) Christopher Díaz Figueroa	(Ecuador) Diego Acosta (Ecuador) Patricio Alvarado	6–3, 4–6, [10–12]
Loss	0–3	Aug 2009	Ecuador F3, Quito	Futures	Clay	(Guatemala) Christopher Díaz Figueroa	(United States) Christian Guevara (United States) Maciek Sykut	4–6, 4–6
Win	1–3	Nov 2009	El Salvador F2, Santa Tecla	Futures	Clay	(El Salvador) Rafael Arévalo	(Guatemala) Christopher Díaz Figueroa (Guatemala) Julen Urigüen	7–6^{(7–5)}, 6–4
Loss	1–4	Nov 2009	Colombia F2, Medellín	Futures	Clay	(Peru) Mauricio Echazú	(Ecuador) Iván Endara (Chile) Guillermo Rivera Aránguiz	6–2, 3–6, [7–10]
Loss	1–5	Aug 2011	Mexico F9, Tijuana	Futures	Hard	(Australia) Robert McKenzie	(Uruguay) Marcel Felder (Mexico) Daniel Garza	5–7, 6–7^{(4–7)}
Win	2–5	Sep 2011	Mexico F10, Zacatecas	Futures	Hard	(Mexico) César Ramírez	(Guatemala) Christopher Díaz Figueroa (Guatemala) Sebastien Vidal	6–3, 6–2
Win	3–5	Oct 2011	Mexico F12, Veracruz	Futures	Hard	(Puerto Rico) Alex Llompart	(Mexico) Javier Herrera-Eguiluz (United States) Amrit Narasimhan	6–3, 6–0
Win	4–5	Feb 2012	Panama F1, Panama City	Futures	Clay	(Mexico) César Ramírez	(Guatemala) Christopher Díaz Figueroa (Guatemala) Sebastien Vidal	6–1, 6–4
Loss	4–6	May 2012	Mexico F8, Puebla	Futures	Hard	(Colombia) Felipe Mantilla	(Mexico) Alejandro Moreno Figueroa (Mexico) Miguel Ángel Reyes-Varela	2–6, 5–7
Win	5–6	May 2012	Peru F4, Arequipa	Futures	Clay	(Brazil) Marcelo Demoliner	(Argentina) Andres Ceppo (Colombia) Felipe Mantilla	6–2, 6–2
Loss	5–7	Jun 2012	Peru F5, Trujillo	Futures	Clay	(Brazil) Marcelo Demoliner	(Chile) Jorge Aguilar (Ecuador) Julio César Campozano	4–6, 6–3, [6–10]
Win	6–7	Jul 2012	USA F21, Godfrey	Futures	Hard	(United States) Ryan Rowe	(France) Sebastien Boltz (Switzerland) Luca Margaroli	6–4, 6–4
Win	7–7	Sep 2012	Mexico F10, Manzanillo	Futures	Hard	(Mexico) Miguel Ángel Reyes-Varela	(Guatemala) Christopher Díaz Figueroa (Barbados) Darian King	6–1, 7–5
Loss	7–8	Oct 2012	Venezuela F4, Caracas	Futures	Hard	(Venezuela) Piero Luisi	(Italy) Enrico Fioravante (Italy) Claudio Grassi	6–3, 5–7, [3–10]
Loss	7–9	Mar 2013	Colombia F1, Pereira	Futures	Clay	(Greece) Theodoros Angelinos	(Germany) Gero Kretschmer (Germany) Alexander Satschko	4–6, 4–6
Win	8–9	May 2013	Guatemala F1, Guatemala City	Futures	Hard	(Guatemala) Christopher Díaz Figueroa	(Moldova) Roman Borvanov (United States) Vahid Mirzadeh	6–2, 7–6^{(7–0)}
Win	9–9	May 2013	El Salvador F1, Santa Tecla	Futures	Clay	(United States) Vahid Mirzadeh	(Colombia) Nicolás Barrientos (Australia) Chris Letcher	6–4, 6–3
Win	10–9	Jun 2013	USA F14, Innisbrook	Futures	Clay	(Venezuela) Roberto Maytín	(United States) Sekou Bangoura (United States) Eric Quigley	3–6, 6–4, [10–7]
Loss	10–10	Jun 2013	USA F15, Indian Harbour Beach	Futures	Clay	(Venezuela) Roberto Maytín	(Moldova) Roman Borvanov (Canada) Milan Pokrajac	6–7^{(4–7)}, 3–6
Loss	10–11	Jun 2013	USA F16, Amelia Island	Futures	Clay	(Venezuela) Roberto Maytín	(United States) Jarmere Jenkins (United States) Mac Styslinger	4–6, 2–6
Win	11–11	Jul 2013	Manta, Ecuador	Challenger	Hard	(Peru) Sergio Galdós	(Colombia) Alejandro González (Colombia) Carlos Salamanca	6–3, 6–4
Loss	11–12	Aug 2013	São Paulo, Brazil	Challenger	Clay	(Colombia) Nicolás Barrientos	(Brazil) Fernando Romboli (Argentina) Eduardo Schwank	7–6^{(8–6)}, 4–6, [8–10]
Win	12–12	Nov 2013	Mexico F19, Mérida	Futures	Hard	(Puerto Rico) Alex Llompart	(Mexico) Daniel Garza (Mexico) Angel Peredo	6–4, 7–5
Win	13–12	Feb 2014	Guatemala F1, Guatemala City	Futures	Hard	(Guatemala) Christopher Díaz Figueroa	(Ecuador) Emilio Gómez (Venezuela) Luis David Martínez	6–3, 7–6^{(7–5)}
Win	14–12	Aug 2014	Colombia F3, Medellín	Futures	Clay	(Mexico) César Ramírez	(United States) Cătălin Gârd (Argentina) Facundo Mena	6–4, 6–4
Win	15–12	Dec 2014	Mexico F14, Mérida	Futures	Hard	(Italy) Claudio Grassi	(United States) Dennis Novikov (United States) Clay Thompson	6–2, 6–4
Loss	15–13	Jan 2015	USA F5, Weston	Futures	Clay	(Venezuela) Luis David Martínez	(Monaco) Romain Arneodo (Monaco) Benjamin Balleret	5–7, 6–7^{(2–7)}
Win	16–13	Feb 2015	El Salvador F1, Santa Tecla	Futures	Clay	(Venezuela) Luis David Martínez	(South Africa) Keith-Patrick Crowley (Mexico) Hans Hach Verdugo	6–4, 6–4
Win	17–13	Sep 2015	Barranquilla, Colombia	Challenger	Clay	(Peru) Sergio Galdós	(Peru) Duilio Beretta (Peru) Mauricio Echazú	6–1, 6–4
Loss	17–14	Oct 2015	Pereira, Colombia	Challenger	Clay	(Colombia) Juan Sebastián Gómez	(Argentina) Andrés Molteni (Brazil) Fernando Romboli	4–6, 6–7^{(12–14)}
Loss	17–15	Nov 2015	El Salvador F2, La Libertad	Futures	Hard	(Guatemala) Christopher Díaz Figueroa	(Ecuador) Emilio Gómez (Barbados) Darian King	3–6, 6–7^{(10–12)}
Win	18–15	Nov 2015	Guatemala F2, Guatemala City	Futures	Hard	(Guatemala) Christopher Díaz Figueroa	(Guatemala) Wilfredo Gonzalez (Poland) Piotr Lomacki	7–5, 6–2
Win	19–15	Dec 2015	Honduras F1, San Pedro Sula	Futures	Hard	(Guatemala) Christopher Díaz Figueroa	(Mexico) Ivar Jose Aramburu Contreras (United States) Nicholas Reyes	6–2, 6–1
Loss	19–16	Feb 2016	Cuernavaca, Mexico	Challenger	Hard	(Peru) Sergio Galdós	(Canada) Philip Bester (Canada) Peter Polansky	4–6, 6–3, [6–10]
Loss	19–17	Apr 2016	Sarasota, USA	Challenger	Clay	(Peru) Sergio Galdós	(Argentina) Facundo Argüello (Argentina) Nicolás Kicker	6–4, 4–6, [6–10]
Loss	19–18	Jun 2016	Caltanissetta, Italy	Challenger	Clay	(Mexico) Miguel Ángel Reyes-Varela	(Argentina) Guido Andreozzi (Argentina) Andrés Molteni	1–6, 2–6
Loss	19–19	Nov 2016	Guayaquil, Ecuador	Challenger	Clay	(Peru) Sergio Galdós	(Uruguay) Ariel Behar (Brazil) Fabiano de Paula	2–6, 4–6
Win	20–19	Nov 2016	Bogotá, Colombia	Challenger	Clay	(Peru) Sergio Galdós	(Uruguay) Ariel Behar (Ecuador) Gonzalo Escobar	6–4, 6–1
Win	21–19	Nov 2016	El Salvador F2, La Libertad	Futures	Hard	(Guatemala) Christopher Díaz Figueroa	(Germany) Pirmin Haenle (United States) Nicholas Reyes	6–0, 6–4
Loss	21–20	Feb 2017	Tempe, USA	Challenger	Hard	(Dominican Republic) José Hernández-Fernández	(Italy) Walter Trusendi (Italy) Matteo Viola	7–5, 2–6, [10–12]
Win	22–20	Sep 2017	Quito, Ecuador	Challenger	Clay	(Mexico) Miguel Ángel Reyes-Varela	(Chile) Nicolás Jarry (Ecuador) Roberto Quiroz	4–6, 6–4, [10–7]
Win	23–20	Sep 2017	Bogotá, Colombia	Challenger	Clay	(Mexico) Miguel Ángel Reyes-Varela	(Croatia) Nikola Mektić (Croatia) Franko Škugor	6–3, 3–6, [10–6]
Win	24–20	Sep 2017	Cary, USA	Challenger	Hard	(Mexico) Miguel Ángel Reyes-Varela	(Latvia) Miķelis Lībietis (United States) Dennis Novikov	6–7^{(6–8)}, 7–6^{(7–1)}, [10–6]
Loss	24–21	Oct 2017	Tiburon, USA	Challenger	Hard	(Mexico) Miguel Ángel Reyes-Varela	(Sweden) André Göransson (France) Florian Lakat	4–6, 4–6
Win	25–21	Oct 2017	Cali, Colombia	Challenger	Clay	(Mexico) Miguel Ángel Reyes-Varela	(Peru) Sergio Galdós (Brazil) Fabrício Neis	6–3, 6–4
Win	26–21	Nov 2017	Guayaquil, Ecuador	Challenger	Clay	(Mexico) Miguel Ángel Reyes-Varela	(Bolivia) Hugo Dellien (Bolivia) Federico Zeballos	6–1, 6–7^{(7–9)}, [10–6]
Loss	26–22	Oct 2017	Rio de Janeiro, Brazil	Challenger	Clay	(Mexico) Miguel Ángel Reyes-Varela	(Argentina) Máximo González (Brazil) Fabrício Neis	7–5, 4–6, [4–10]
Win	27–22	Feb 2018	San Francisco, USA	Challenger	Hard (i)	(Venezuela) Roberto Maytín	(United Kingdom) Luke Bambridge (United Kingdom) Joe Salisbury	6–3, 6–7^{(5–7)}, [10–7]
Win	28–22	Apr 2018	San Luis Potosí, Mexico	Challenger	Clay	(Mexico) Miguel Ángel Reyes-Varela	(United Kingdom) Jay Clarke (Germany) Kevin Krawietz	6–1, 6–4
Win	29–22	Apr 2018	Guadalajara, Mexico	Challenger	Hard	(Mexico) Miguel Ángel Reyes-Varela	(United Kingdom) Brydan Klein (South Africa) Ruan Roelofse	7–6^{(7–3)}, 7–5
Win	30–22	May 2018	Lisbon, Portugal	Challenger	Clay	(Mexico) Miguel Ángel Reyes-Varela	(Poland) Tomasz Bednarek (United States) Hunter Reese	6–3, 3–6, [10–1]
Win	31–22	Oct 2018	Monterrey, Mexico	Challenger	Hard	(India) Jeevan Nedunchezhiyan	(India) Leander Paes (Mexico) Miguel Ángel Reyes-Varela	6–1, 6–4
Win	32–22	Oct 2018	Las Vegas, USA	Challenger	Hard	(Venezuela) Roberto Maytín	(United States) Robert Galloway (United States) Nathan Pasha	6–3, 6–3
Loss	32–23	Nov 2018	Houston, USA	Challenger	Hard	(United States) James Cerretani	(United States) Austin Krajicek (United States) Nicholas Monroe	6–4, 6–7^{(3–7)}, [5–10]
Win	33–23	Apr 2019	San Luis Potosí, Mexico	Challenger	Clay	(Mexico) Miguel Ángel Reyes-Varela	(Uruguay) Ariel Behar (Ecuador) Roberto Quiroz	1–6, 6–4, [12–10]
Win	34–23	Aug 2019	Aptos, USA	Challenger	Hard	(Mexico) Miguel Ángel Reyes-Varela	(United States) Nathan Pasha (United States) Max Schnur	5–7, 6–3, [10–8]
Loss	34–24	Jan 2020	Bendigo, Australia	Challenger	Hard	(United Kingdom) Jonny O'Mara	(Serbia) Nikola Ćaćić (Ukraine) Denys Molchanov	6–7^{(3–7)}, 4-6
Win	35-24	Oct 2020	Parma, Italy	Challenger	Clay	(Bosnia and Herzegovina) Tomislav Brkić	(Uruguay) Ariel Behar (Ecuador) Gonzalo Escobar	6–4, 6–4

== Davis Cup ==
=== Participations: (45–30) ===
Group membership World Group (0–0) WG play-off (0–0) Group I (0–0) Group II (38–29) Group III (7–1) Group IV (0–0)	Matches by surface Hard (28–17) Clay (17–13) Grass (0–0) Carpet (0–0)	Matches by type Singles (29–17) Doubles (16–13)

- ▲ ▼ indicates the outcome of the Davis Cup match followed by the score, date, place of event, the zonal classification and its phase, and the court surface.

Rubber outcome	No.	Rubber	Match type (partner if any)	Opponent nation	Opponent player(s)	Score
▼0–2; 6 March 2005; Club de Tenis La Paz, La Paz, Bolivia; Americas Zone Group III 5th-8th play-off round robin; clay surface
Loss	1	I	Singles	Honduras	Carlos Cáceres	1–6, 1–6
▼1–4; 9-11 February 2007; Pabellon de Tenis del Aprque del Este, Santo Domingo, Dominican Republic; Americas Zone Group II first round; hard surface
Loss	2	II	Singles	Dominican Republic	Víctor Estrella Burgos	4–6, 3–6, 1–6
Loss	3	III	Doubles (with Rafael Arévalo)	Dominican Republic	Henry Estrella / Víctor Estrella Burgos	6–7^{(0–7)}, 6–7^{(5–7)}, 6–7^{(2–7)}
▲4–1; 6-8 April 2007; Maya Country Club, Santa Tecla, El Salvador; Americas Zone Group II relegation play-off; clay surface
Loss	4	II	Singles	Cuba	Edgar Hernandez-Perez	4–6, 6–3, 4–6, 0–2 ret.
Win	5	III	Doubles (with Rafael Arévalo)	Cuba	Luis Javier Cuellar-Contreras / Sandor Martínez-Breijo	6–4, 7–5, 6–1
▼2–3; 8-10 February 2008; Yacht y Golf Club Paraguayo, Lambaré, Paraguay; Americas Zone Group II first round; clay surface
Loss	6	I	Singles	Paraguay	Ramón Delgado	1–6, 0–6, 2–6
Win	7	III	Doubles (with Rafael Arévalo)	Paraguay	Juan Enrique Crosa / Ramón Delgado	7–6^{(7–3)}, 7–5, 6–3
Loss	8	V	Singles	Paraguay	Juan Carlos Ramírez	6–3, 1–6, 1–6, 3–6
▼1–4; 11-13 April 2008; Ciudad Olimpica de San Juan de Los Morros, San Juan de los Morros, Venezuela; Americas Zone Group II relegation play-off; hard surface
Loss	9	II	Singles	Venezuela	Yohny Romero	6–4, 2–6, 4–6, 4–2 ret.
▲3–0; 22 April 2009; Maya Country Club, La Libertad, El Salvador; Americas Zone Group III Pool A round robin; clay surface
Win	10	I	Singles	Bolivia	Mauricio Estívariz	6–4, 6–4
Win	11	III	Doubles (with Rafael Arévalo) (dead rubber)	Bolivia	Mauricio Doria-Medina / Mauricio Estívariz	5–7, 6–4, 6–3
▲2–1; 24 April 2009; Maya Country Club, La Libertad, El Salvador; Americas Zone Group III Pool A round robin; clay surface
Win	12	III	Doubles (with Rafael Arévalo)	Barbados	Haydn Lewis / Russell Moseley	4–6, 6–3, 6–4
▲3–0; 25 April 2009; Maya Country Club, La Libertad, El Salvador; Americas Zone Group III 1st-4th play-off round robin; clay surface
Win	13	I	Singles	Cuba	William Dorantes Sanchez	6–3, 7–5
Win	14	III	Doubles (with Rodrigo Rappaccioli) (dead rubber)	Cuba	Favel-Antonio Freyre-Perdomo / Sandor Martínez-Breijo	7–6^{(7–1)}, 6–4
▲3–0; 26 April 2009; Maya Country Club, La Libertad, El Salvador; Americas Zone Group III 1st-4th play-off round robin; clay surface
Win	15	I	Singles	Puerto Rico	Gabriel Flores Ruiz	6–2, 6–0
Win	16	III	Doubles (with Rodrigo Rappaccioli) (dead rubber)	Puerto Rico	Gabriel Flores Ruiz / Jose Emilio Sierra-Short	6–7^{(4–7)}, 6–1, 6–3
▼0–5; 5-7 March 2010; Club Lawn Tennis De La Exposicion, Lima, Peru; Americas Zone Group II first round; clay surface
Loss	17	II	Singles	Peru	Mauricio Echazú	6–2, 2–6, 4–6, 6–3, 3–6
Loss	18	III	Doubles (with Rafael Arévalo)	Peru	Sergio Galdós / Iván Miranda	5–7, 6–3, 7–6^{(7–4)}, 4–6, 4–6
Loss	19	IV	Singles (dead rubber)	Peru	Álvaro Raposo de Oliveira	5–7, 3–6
▲4–1; 9-11 July 2010; Javier Luizaga, Cochabamba, Bolivia; Americas Zone Group II relegation play-off; clay surface
Win	20	II	Singles	Bolivia	Mauricio Doria-Medina	7–6^{(7–4)}, 6–2, 7–6^{(7–5)}
Win	21	III	Doubles (with Rafael Arévalo)	Bolivia	Mauricio Doria-Medina / Federico Zeballos	6–4, 6–4, 6–1
▼0–5; 4-6 March 2011; Maya Country Club, Santa Tecla, El Salvador; Americas Zone Group II first round; clay surface
Loss	22	I	Singles	Dominican Republic	Jhonson García	3–6, 3–6, 1–6
Loss	23	III	Doubles (with Rafael Arévalo)	Dominican Republic	Víctor Estrella Burgos / José Hernández-Fernández	4–6, 4–6, 6–4, 4–6
▲3–2; 8-10 July 2011; Maya Country Club, Santa Tecla, El Salvador; Americas Zone Group II relegation play-off; clay surface
Win	24	II	Singles	Netherlands Antilles	Martijn van Haasteren	6–1, 5–7, 6–2, 7–6^{(7–4)}
Win	25	III	Doubles (with Rafael Arévalo)	Netherlands Antilles	Alexander Blom / Martijn van Haasteren	6–3, 6–2, 6–3
Loss	26	IV	Singles	Netherlands Antilles	Alexander Blom	4–6, 4–6, 6–3, 6–3, 3–6
▼0–5; 10-12 February 2012; Rafael El Pelon Osuna, Mexico City, Mexico; Americas Zone Group II first round; clay surface
Loss	27	II	Singles	Mexico	César Ramírez	1–6, 3–6, 4–6
Loss	28	III	Doubles (with Rafael Arévalo)	Mexico	Santiago González / César Ramírez	4–6, 2–6, 5–7
Loss	29	IV	Singles (dead rubber)	Mexico	Daniel Garza	4–6, 6–2, 3–6
▲3–2; 6-8 April 2012; Federacion Salvadorena de Tenis, Santa Tecla, El Salvador; Americas Zone Group II relegation play-off; hard surface
Win	30	II	Singles	Paraguay	Juan Carlos Ramírez	6–2, 6–3, 6–3
Win	31	III	Doubles (with Rafael Arévalo)	Paraguay	Diego Galeano / Juan Carlos Ramírez	6–3, 6–4, 6–4
▲4–1; 1-3 February 2013; Maya Country Club, Santa Tecla, El Salvador; Americas Zone Group II first round; clay surface
Win	32	II	Singles	Barbados	Anthony Marshall	6–1, 6–1, 6–1
Win	33	III	Doubles (with Rafael Arévalo)	Barbados	Darian King / Russell Moseley	2–6, 6–3, 6–4, 6–2
▲3–2; 5-7 April 2013; Federacion Salvadorena de Tenis, Santa Tecla, El Salvador; Americas Zone Group II second round; hard surface
Win	34	I	Singles	Mexico	Daniel Garza	6–4, 6–4, 6–7^{(7–9)}, 6–2
Win	35	III	Doubles (with Rafael Arévalo)	Mexico	Daniel Garza / Miguel Ángel Reyes-Varela	6–7^{(4–7)}, 6–4, 4–6, 6–2, 6–2
▼1–3; 13-15 September 2013; Federacion Salvadorena de Tenis, Santa Tecla, El Salvador; Americas Zone Group II Promotional play-off; hard surface
Loss	36	II	Singles	Venezuela	Ricardo Rodríguez	6–1, 6–7^{(4–7)}, 2–6, 4–6
Loss	37	III	Doubles (with Rafael Arévalo)	Venezuela	Luis David Martínez / Roberto Maytín	6–7^{(2–7)}, 6–3, 5–7, 6–2, 2–6
Loss	38	IV	Singles	Venezuela	David Souto	7–6^{(7–3)}, 3–6, 6–7^{(3–7)}, 3–6
▲3–2; 31 January – 2 February 2014; Club Internacional de Tenis – Estadio Víctor Pecci, Asunción, Paraguay; Americas Zone Group II first round; clay surface
Win	39	I	Singles	Paraguay	Juan Borba	6–2, 6–2, 6–4
Win	40	III	Doubles (with Rafael Arévalo)	Paraguay	Diego Galeano / Juan Carlos Ramírez	6–3, 6–4, 6–4
▼1–4; 4-6 April 2014; National Tennis Centre, Saint Michael, Barbados; Americas Zone Group II second round; hard surface
Win	41	II	Singles	Barbados	Haydn Lewis	7–6^{(7–5)}, 5–7, 6–4, 7–6^{(7–1)}
Loss	42	III	Doubles (with Rafael Arévalo)	Barbados	Darian King / Haydn Lewis	6–2, 4–6, 6–7^{(9–11)} ret.
Loss	43	IV	Singles	Barbados	Darian King	0–6, 0–1 ret.
▲3–2; 6-8 March 2015; Palmas del Mar Tennis Club, Humacao, Puerto Rico; Americas Zone Group II first round; hard surface
Win	44	I	Singles	Paraguay	Gabriel Flores Ruiz	6–2, 6–1, 6–0
Win	45	III	Doubles (with Rafael Arévalo)	Paraguay	Alex Llompart / Gabriel Montilla	6–2, 6–1, 6–2
Win	46	IV	Singles	Paraguay	Alex Llompart	6–3, 6–2, 6–1
▼2–3; 17-19 July 2015; Cancha Oscar E Payot, Caracas, Venezuela; Americas Zone Group II second round; hard surface
Win	47	I	Singles	Venezuela	David Souto	6–2, 6–2, 6–3
Loss	48	III	Doubles (with Rafael Arévalo)	Venezuela	Luis David Martínez / David Souto	5–7, 4–6, 4–6
Win	49	IV	Singles	Venezuela	Ricardo Rodríguez	6–2, 6–7^{(3–7)}, 6–4, 6–3
▲3–2; 4-6 March 2016; Complejo Polideportivo de Ciudad Merliot, Santa Tecla, El Salvador; Americas Zone Group II first round; hard surface
Win	50	II	Singles	Puerto Rico	Alex Díaz	6–2, 6–2, 6–0
Win	51	III	Doubles (with Rafael Arévalo)	Puerto Rico	Sebastián Arcila / Alex Díaz	6–7^{(6–8)}, 6–2, 6–2, 6–3
Win	52	IV	Singles	Puerto Rico	Sebastián Arcila	6–2, 7–5, 6–1
▼2–3; 15-17 July 2016; Complejo Polideportivo de Ciudad Merliot, Santa Tecla, El Salvador; Americas Zone Group II second round; hard surface
Win	53	I	Singles	Venezuela	Jordi Muñoz Abreu	6–1, 6–1, 7–5
Loss	54	III	Doubles (with Rafael Arévalo)	Venezuela	Luis David Martínez / Roberto Maytín	4–6, 6–3, 3–6, 6–7^{(4–7)}
Win	55	IV	Singles	Venezuela	Ricardo Rodríguez	6–1, 6–2, 6–4
▲3–2; 3-5 February 2017; Circulo Deportivo Internacional, San Salvador, El Salvador; Americas Zone Group II first round; hard surface
Win	56	II	Singles	Bolivia	Hugo Dellien	6–2, 6–4, 7–5
Win	57	III	Doubles (with Rafael Arévalo)	Bolivia	Rodrigo Banzer / Hugo Dellien	6–4, 6–7^{(5–7)}, 6–4, 6–2
Win	58	IV	Singles	Bolivia	Federico Zeballos	6–3, 6–3, 6–1
▼2–3; 7-9 April 2017; Doral Park Country Club, Doral, United States; Americas Zone Group II second round; hard surface
Win	59	I	Singles	Venezuela	Jesús Bandrés	6–2, 6–7^{(4–7)}, 6–3, 6–2
Loss	60	III	Doubles (with Rafael Arévalo)	Venezuela	Luis David Martínez / Jordi Muñoz Abreu	7–6^{(7–5)}, 5–7, 6–4, 5–7, 4–6
Win	61	IV	Singles	Venezuela	Ricardo Rodríguez	6–2, 6–2, 6–3
▼1–4; 3-4 February 2018; Circulo Deportivo Internacional, San Salvador, El Salvador; Americas Zone Group II first round; hard surface
Win	62	II	Singles	Uruguay	Martín Cuevas	6–3, 6–7^{(4–7)}, 7–6^{(7–5)}
Loss	63	III	Doubles (with Rafael Arévalo)	Uruguay	Martín Cuevas / Pablo Cuevas	6–7^{(5–7)}, 6–7^{(2–7)}
Loss	64	IV	Singles	Uruguay	Pablo Cuevas	4–6, 4–6
▼1–3; 7-8 April 2018; Federacion Nacional de Tenis, Guatemala City, Guatemala; Americas Zone Group II relegation play-off; hard surface
Win	65	I	Singles	Guatemala	Wilfredo González	5–7, 7–6^{(7–3)}, 6–2
Loss	66	III	Doubles (with Rafael Arévalo)	Guatemala	Christopher Díaz Figueroa / Wilfredo González	6–7^{(4–7)}, 5–7
▼2–3; 5-6 April 2019; Complejo Polideportivo de Ciudad Merliot, Santa Tecla, El Salvador; Americas Zone Group II first round; hard surface
Win	67	II	Singles	Peru	Nicolás Álvarez	6–4, 6–2
Loss	68	III	Doubles (with Rafael Arévalo)	Peru	Sergio Galdós / Juan Pablo Varillas	5–7, 2–6
Win	69	IV	Singles	Peru	Juan Pablo Varillas	6–7^{(4–7)}, 6–4, 7–6^{(7–3)}
▲3–1; 6-7 March 2020; Complejo Polideportivo de Ciudad Merliot, Santa Tecla, El Salvador; World Group II Play-off first round; hard surface
Win	70	II	Singles	Jamaica	Rowland Phillips	6–3, 6–7^{(4–7)}, 6–2
Win	71	III	Doubles (with Lluis Miralles)	Jamaica	Blaise Bicknell / Rowland Phillips	6–3, 6–2
Win	72	IV	Singles	Jamaica	Blaise Bicknell	6–4, 7–6^{(7–5)}
▼1–3; 5-6 March 2021; Arena Kalisz, Kalisz, Poland; World Group II first round; hard (indoor) surface
Loss	73	I	Singles	Poland	Kacper Żuk	6–7^{(5–7)}, 1–6
Loss	74	III	Doubles (with Lluis Miralles)	Poland	Łukasz Kubot / Jan Zieliński	4–6, 2–6
Win	75	IV	Singles (dead rubber)	Poland	Wojciech Marek	6–4, 6–2
