= 2019 Davis Cup Americas Zone Group II =

International tennis competition

The Americas Zone will be one of the three regional zones of the 2019 Davis Cup.

== Participating nations ==
Seeds:

1. Peru
2. Mexico
3. Guatemala

Remaining nations:

- Bolivia
- El Salvador
- Paraguay

== Results summary ==
Home team	Score	Away team	Location	Venue	Surface
El Salvador	2–3	Peru [1]	Santa Tecla	Complejo Polideportivo de Ciudad Merliot	Hard
Paraguay	1–4	Mexico [2]	Asunción	Club Internacional de Tenis	Clay
Guatemala [3]	2–3	Bolivia	Guatemala City	Federación Nacional de Tenis	Hard

== Results ==
=== El Salvador vs. Peru ===
El Salvador
2
Complejo Polideportivo de Ciudad Merliot, Santa Tecla, El Salvador
5–6 April 2019
Hard

Peru
3

			1	2	3
1	(El Salvador) (Peru)	Alberto Emmanuel Alvarado Larín; Juan Pablo Varillas	3; 6	4; 6
2	(El Salvador) (Peru)	Marcelo Arévalo; Nicolás Álvarez	6; 4	6; 2
3	(El Salvador) (Peru)	Marcelo Arévalo / Rafael Arévalo; Sergio Galdós / Juan Pablo Varillas	5; 7	2; 6
4	(El Salvador) (Peru)	Marcelo Arévalo; Juan Pablo Varillas	6^{4} 7^{7}	6; 4	7^{7} 6^{3}
5	(El Salvador) (Peru)	Kyle Johnson; Nicolás Álvarez	3; 6	2; 6

=== Paraguay vs. Mexico ===
Paraguay
1
Club Internacional de Tenis, Asunción, Paraguay
14–15 September 2019
Clay

Mexico
4

			1	2	3
1	(Paraguay) (Mexico)	Ayed Zatar; Manuel Sánchez	3; 6	2; 6
2	(Paraguay) (Mexico)	Juan Borba; Lucas Gómez	4; 6	4; 6
3	(Paraguay) (Mexico)	Juan Borba / Ayed Zatar; Santiago González / Miguel Ángel Reyes-Varela	1; 6	6; 3	6; 4
4	(Paraguay) (Mexico)	Ayed Zatar; Lucas Gómez	4; 6	4; 6
5	(Paraguay) (Mexico)	Adolfo Daniel Vallejo; Manuel Sánchez	3; 6	2; 6

=== Guatemala vs. Bolivia ===
Guatemala
2
Federación Nacional de Tenis, Guatemala City, Guatemala
13–14 September 2019
Hard

Bolivia
3

			1	2	3
1	(Guatemala) (Bolivia)	Sebastián Domínguez; Hugo Dellien	1; 6	0; 6
2	(Guatemala) (Bolivia)	Wilfredo González; Federico Zeballos	6; 3	3; 6	6; 3
3	(Guatemala) (Bolivia)	Stefan Emilio González / Wilfredo González; Juan Carlos Aguilar / Hugo Dellien	6; 4	6; 4
4	(Guatemala) (Bolivia)	Wilfredo González; Hugo Dellien	2; 6	5; 7
5	(Guatemala) (Bolivia)	Franz Luna Lavidalie; Federico Zeballos	4; 6	4; 6
