= Ayed Zatar =

Paraguayan tennis player

- Full name: Ayed Farid Zatar Cordero
- Country (sports): Paraguay
- Born: 29 March 1996 (age 28); Asunción, Paraguay
- Height: 2.00 m (6 ft 7 in)
- Plays: Right-handed (two-handed backhand)
- College: Middle Tennessee State University; Georgia Gwinnett College

Singles
- Career record: 2–6
- Career titles: 0

Doubles
- Career record: 3–3
- Career titles: 0

Team competitions
- Davis Cup: 15–10
Medal record
Representing Paraguay
Bolivarian Games
Bronze medal – third place	2017 Santa Marta	Mixed Doubles
- Last updated on: 10 August 2020.

Ayed Farid Zatar Cordero (born 29 March 1996) is a Paraguayan male tennis player.

He represents Paraguay at the Davis Cup, where he has a singles W/L record of 9–7, and a doubles W/L of 6–3. He also won a bronze medal in the mixed doubles event at the 2017 Bolivarian Games.

== Early years ==
Zatar was born to Shukri Zatar Yambay and Alba Cordero Rivas on 29 March 1996 in Asunción, the oldest of five children. He began training in tennis at the age of five.

In 2012, he travelled to the United States to compete at the Orange Bowl 16 and under tournament in Plantation, Florida. He was ranked number one nationally in the 16- and 18-year-old age groups, and ranked as high as number 156 in the ITF junior rankings. By the time he arrived at Middle Tennessee State University in the United States to play college tennis, he also sat atop the men's open national rankings.

== College career ==
In his first and only season with the Middle Tennessee Blue Raiders in 2015–16, Zatar was named all-Conference USA (C-USA) second-team in singles and first-team in doubles. At his first competition, the Dale Short Shootout, he took two wins. In late January he was named C-USA Men's Tennis Athlete of the Week for his performance in their loss against Vanderbilt, scoring the only singles victory for the Blue Raiders against the 25th-ranked team in the country. He finished the year off with a singles win against Charlotte in the C-USA Championship finals.

Zatar transferred to Georgia Gwinnett College for his sophomore season and won three straight NAIA team national championships with the Grizzlies from 2017 to 2019, compiling a record of 23–4 in singles matches and 47–5 in doubles play. In his junior year, he teamed with Valentino Caratini to win the ITA Oracle Cup Doubles Super Bowl as well as the NAIA men's doubles national championship. He then finished his senior season ranked number one in the final 2019 Oracle/ITA national doubles rankings alongside Federico Bonacia. Zatar earned NAIA All-American second-team honors in the final two years of his college career.

He earned his diploma in December 2019.

== Professional career ==
Zatar won a bronze medal at the 2017 Bolivarian Games in Santa Marta, Colombia, teaming with Camila Giangreco Campiz in the mixed doubles event. That year he was named best male tennis player at the Tigo Sports awards show in Asunción.

=== Davis Cup ===
He made his Davis Cup debut in 2015 in the Americas Zone Group III, defeating José Gilbert Gómez in straight sets in their first-round tie against Panama. He went undefeated in group play, winning all four of his matches, before beating Rowland Phillips in three sets in their victory over Jamaica in the promotion playoffs. In the 2016 Davis Cup Americas Zone Group II he went 2–2 overall against Venezuela and Puerto Rico, defeating the latter to avoid relegation. In 2017, he won only one of his four singles matches, defeating Haydn Lewis in straight sets while suffering two losses in doubles play with Brítez. Paraguay was relegated to Group III.

In 2018, during their opening day tie against Panama, he defeated Walner Espinoza in three sets before teaming with Diego Galeano to beat Jorge Daniel Chévez and Luis Alejandro Espinoza Bares in doubles. He won all five of his matches in group play before they fell to Honduras in the promotional playoffs, where Zatar lost in straight sets to Jaime Bendeck. In 2019 they faced group favorites Mexico in the quarterfinals in his hometown of Asunción. Although he and Juan Borna upset Santiago González and Miguel Ángel Reyes-Varela in the doubles rubber, Zatar lost both of his singles matches and Paraguay would lose the tie 1–4. At the 2020 Davis Cup World Group II play-offs Paraguay defeated Sri Lanka 4–0 to qualify for World Group II. Zatar played the doubles rubber with Juan Borba, defeating Yasitha de Silva and Sharmal Dissanayake.

==== Participations: (15–10) ====
Group membership World Group (0–0) Qualifying Round (0–0) WG play-off (1–0) Group I (0–0) Group II (4–9) Group III (10–1) Group IV (0–0)	Matches by surface Hard (5–6) Clay (10–4) Grass (0–0) Carpet (0–0)	Matches by type Singles (9–7) Doubles (6–3)

- ▲ ▼ indicates the outcome of the Davis Cup match followed by the score, date, place of event, the zonal classification and its phase, and the court surface.

Rubber outcome	No.	Rubber	Match type (partner if any)	Opponent nation	Opponent player(s)	Score
▲3–0; 20 July 2015; Centro de Alto Rendimiento Fred Maduro, Panama City, Panama; Americas Zone round robin; clay surface
Victory	1	II	Singles	Panama	José Gilbert Gómez	6–4, 6–4
▲3–0; 21 July 2015; Centro de Alto Rendimiento Fred Maduro, Panama City, Panama; Americas Zone round robin; clay surface
Victory	2	I	Singles	Cuba	Omar Hernández Moreno	6–2, 7–5
Victory	3	III	Doubles (with Bruno Brítez)	Cuba	Yasier Estrada / Omar Hernández Moreno	7–5, 6–3
▲3–0; 23 July 2015; Centro de Alto Rendimiento Fred Maduro, Panama City, Panama; Americas Zone round robin; clay surface
Victory	4	I	Singles	Honduras	Alejandro Obando	6–1, 6–0
▲2–0; 25 July 2015; Centro de Alto Rendimiento Fred Maduro, Panama City, Panama; Americas Zone Promotion Play Off; clay surface
Victory	5	I	Singles	Jamaica	Rowland Phillips	6–4, 6–7^{(6–8)}, 7–5
▼0–5; 4–6 March 2016; Cancha José Ignacio Colell, Valencia, Venezuela; Americas Zone first round; hard surface
Defeat	6	II	Singles	Venezuela	Luis David Martínez	5–7, 6–3, 7–5, 6–7^{(7–9)}, 4–6
Defeat	7	III	Doubles (with Bruno Brítez)	Venezuela	Luis David Martínez / Roberto Maytín	2–6, 2–6, 4–6
▲5–0; 15–17 July 2016; Court Central Victor Manuel Pecci del Club Internacional de Tenis, Asunción, Paraguay; Americas Zone relegation play-off; clay surface
Victory	8	I	Singles	Puerto Rico	Sebastián Arcila	6–3, 4–6, 6–3, 6–1
Victory	9	III	Doubles (with Diego Galeano)	Puerto Rico	Sebastián Arcila / Alex Díaz	6–2, 6–2, 6–2
▼2–3; 3–5 February 2017; Rakiura Resort, Asunción, Paraguay; Americas Zone first round; clay surface
Victory	10	I	Singles	Barbados	Haydn Lewis	7–6^{(7–5)}, 7–5, 6–2
Defeat	11	III	Doubles (with Bruno Brítez	Barbados	Darian King / Haydn Lewis	4–6, 4–6, 6–7^{(5–7)}
Defeat	12	IV	Singles	Barbados	Darian King	6–7^{(2–7)}, 1–6, 1–6
▼0–5; 7–9 April 2017; Polideportivo Metropolitano de Tenis, Zapopan, Mexico; Americas Zone relegation play-off; hard surface
Defeat	13	I	Singles	Mexico	Hans Hach	3–6, 6–4, 4–6, 6–3, 3–6
Defeat	14	III	Doubles (with Juan Borba)	Mexico	Santiago González / Luis Patiño	2–6, 2–6, 1–6
Defeat	15	IV	Singles	Mexico	Santiago González	2–6, 0–3 (retired)
▲3–0; 30 May 2018; Costa Rica Country Club, Escazú, Costa Rica; Americas Zone round robin; hard surface
Victory	16	II	Singles	Panama	Walner Espinoza	6–2, 3–6, 6–3
Victory	17	III	Doubles (with Diego Galeano)	Panama	Jorge Daniel Chévez / Luis Alejandro Espinoza Bares	6–3, 7–6^{(7–4)}
▲3–0; 31 May 2018; Costa Rica Country Club, Escazú, Costa Rica; Americas Zone round robin; hard surface
Victory	18	II	Singles	Cuba	Osmel Rivera Granja	6–1, 6–3
Victory	19	III	Doubles (with Diego Galeano)	Cuba	Denilson Martínez / Osmel Rivera Granja	6–1, 6–2
▲2–1; 1 June 2018; Costa Rica Country Club, Escazú, Costa Rica; Americas Zone round robin; hard surface
Victory	20	II	Singles	Costa Rica	Jesse Flores	6–6, 6–4
▼0–2; 2 June 2018; Costa Rica Country Club, Escazú, Costa Rica; Americas Zone Promotion Play Off; hard surface
Defeat	21	II	Singles	Honduras	Jaime Bendeck	4–6, 3–6
▼1–4; 14–15 September 2019; Club Internacional de Tenis, Asunción, Paraguay; Americas Zone first round; clay surface
Defeat	22	I	Singles	Mexico	Manuel Sánchez	3–6, 2–6
Victory	23	III	Doubles (with Juan Borba)	Mexico	Santiago González / Miguel Ángel Reyes-Varela	1–6, 6–3, 6–4
Defeat	24	IV	Singles	Mexico	Lucas Gómez	4–6, 4–6
▲4–0; 6-7 March 2020; Club Internacional de Tenis, Asunción, Paraguay; World Group II Play-off first round; clay surface
Victory	25	III	Doubles (with Juan Borba)	Sri Lanka	Yasitha de Silva / Sharmal Dissanayake	6–1, 6–4

== See also ==
- List of Paraguay Davis Cup team representatives
