= Juan Carlos Aguilar =

British-born Bolivian tennis player

- Full name: Juan Carlos Manuel Aguilar Peña
- Country (sports): Canada (2020–present); Bolivia (2015–19)
- Residence: Montreal, Quebec, Canada
- Born: 20 November 1998 (age 27) London, England
- Height: 1.68 m (5 ft 6 in)
- Plays: Right-handed (two-handed backhand)
- College: Texas A&M; TCU
- Coach: Vincent Millot
- Prize money: $58,387

Singles
- Career record: 1–0
- Career titles: 0; 0 Challenger, 0 Futures
- Highest ranking: No. 409 (30 June 2025)
- Current ranking: No. 409 (30 June 2025)

Doubles
- Career record: 0–1
- Career titles: 0; 2 Challenger, 5 Futures
- Highest ranking: No. 219 (9 June 2025)
- Current ranking: No. 224 (30 June 2025)

Team competitions
- Davis Cup: 1–1
- Last updated on: 30 June 2025.

Juan Carlos Manuel Aguilar Peña (born 20 November 1998) is a British-born Canadian tennis player of Bolivian descent.

On the junior tour, Aguilar has a career high ranking of 23 achieved on 17 October 2016.

Aguilar won the 2016 US Open boys' doubles title, partnering Felipe Meligeni Alves. In doubles he won the ITF G1 Copa del Cafe in Costa Rica partnering Ulises Blanch and the ITF B1 Campeonato Sudamericano de 18 in Argentina, partnering Bruno Britez. In Singles he won two titles in 2016, ITF G2 Condor de Plata in La Paz, Bolivia and the ITF G2 Canada International Event in Montreal, Canada.

== Junior Grand Slam finals ==
=== Doubles: 1 (1 title) ===
Result	Year	Tournament	Surface	Partner	Opponents	Score
Win	2016	US Open	Hard	(Brazil) Felipe Meligeni Alves	(Canada) Félix Auger-Aliassime (Canada) Benjamin Sigouin	6–3, 7–6^{(7–4)}

== ATP Challenger and ITF Futures Finals ==
=== Doubles 13 (8–5) ===
Legend (doubles) ATP Challenger Tour (0–0) ITF Futures Tour (8–5)	Titles by surface Hard (4–4) Clay (4–1) Grass (0–0) Carpet (0–0)

Result	W–L	Date	Tournament	Tier	Surface	Partner	Opponents	Score
Loss	0–1	Sep 2016	F8 Toronto, Canada	Futures	Hard	(Canada) Benjamin Sigouin	(Mexico) Hans Hach Verdugo (United States) Rhyne Williams	3–6, 3–6
Loss	0–2	Sep 2018	F1 Santa Cruz, Bolivia	Futures	Clay	(Argentina) Franco Capalbo	(Bolivia) Federico Zeballos (Argentina) Matías Zukas	7–6^{(8–6)}, 1–6, [5–10]
Win	1–2	Sep 2018	F2 Santa Cruz, Bolivia	Futures	Clay	(Argentina) Franco Capalbo	(Bolivia) Federico Zeballos (Argentina) Matías Zukas	6–3, 6–3
Win	2–2	Jul 2019	M25 Champaign, United States	World Tennis Tour	Hard	(Argentina) Axel Geller	(United States) Keenan Mayo (Venezuela) Ricardo Rodríguez	6–4, 6–3
Win	3–2	Aug 2019	M25 Decatur, United States	World Tennis Tour	Hard	(Argentina) Axel Geller	(Argentina) Alan Kohen (Argentina) Santiago Rodriguez Taverna	6–1, 6–3
Loss	3–3	Dec 2019	M15 Cancún, Mexico	World Tennis Tour	Hard	(Peru) Jorge Panta	(United States) Tanner Smith (United States) Reese Stalder	7–6^{(7–3)}, 1–6, [9–11]
Loss	3–4	Jan 2020	M15 Cancún, Mexico	World Tennis Tour	Hard	(United States) Tanner Smith	(Argentina) Nicolás Alberto Arreche (Spain) David Pérez Sanz	6–7^{(7–9)}, 1–6
Win	4–4	Jul 2022	M15 Bern, Switzerland	World Tennis Tour	Clay	(Switzerland) Jeffrey Von Der Schulenburg	(Switzerland) Mirko Martinez (Switzerland) Luca Staeheli	6–4, 7–5
Win	5–4	Sep 2022	M15 Lubbock, United States	World Tennis Tour	Hard	(United States) Pranav Kumar	(Slovakia) Kristof Minarik (United States) Alexander Richards	6–3, 7–5
Win	6–4	Mar 2023	M25 Montréal, Canada	World Tennis Tour	Hard	(United Kingdom) Joe Tyler	(United Kingdom) Scott Duncan (United Kingdom) Marcus Willis	6–4, 5–7, [11–9]
Win	7–4	Apr 2023	M15 Santo Domingo de los Tsáchilas, Ecuador	World Tennis Tour	Clay	(United States) Ezekiel Clark	(Brazil) Mateo Barreiros Reyes (United States) Victor Lilov	6–1, 7–5
Win	8–4	Apr 2023	M15 Santo Domingo de los Tsáchilas, Ecuador	World Tennis Tour	Clay	(United States) Ezekiel Clark	(Brazil) Luís Britto (Brazil) Paulo Andre Saraiva dos Santos	6–3, 7–5
Loss	8–5	May 2023	M25 Xalapa, Mexico	World Tennis Tour	Hard	(Peru) Jorge Panta	(Ecuador) Andres Andrade (Argentina) Facundo Mena	6–7^{(3–7)}, 3–6

== Davis Cup ==
=== Participations: (1–1) ===
Group membership World Group (0–0) WG Play-off (0–0) Group I (0–0) Group II (1–1) Group III (0–0) Group IV (0–0)	Matches by surface Hard (0–1) Clay (1–0) Grass (0–0) Carpet (0–0)	Matches by type Singles (1–0) Doubles (0–1)

- ▲ ▼ indicates the outcome of the Davis Cup match followed by the score, date, place of event, the zonal classification and its phase, and the court surface.

Rubber outcome	No.	Rubber	Match type (partner if any)	Opponent nation	Opponent player(s)	Score
▲4–1; 7–9 April 2017; Club de Tenis Santa Cruz, Santa Cruz, Bolivia; Americas Zone Group II Relegation play-off; Clay surface
Victory	1	V	Singles (dead rubber)	(The Bahamas) Bahamas	Justin Lunn	6–4, 6–3
▲3–2; 13–14 September 2019; Federación Nacional de Tenis, Guatemala City, Guatemala; Americas Zone Group II First round; Hard surface
Defeat	2	III	Doubles (with Hugo Dellien)	Guatemala	Stefan Emilio González / Wilfredo González	4–6, 4–6
