= Nicolás Álvarez (tennis) =

Peruvian tennis player

- Country (sports): Peru
- Residence: Lima, Peru
- Born: 8 June 1996 (age 30)
- Height: 1.85 m (6 ft 1 in)
- Plays: Right-handed (two handed-backhand)
- College: Duke University
- Prize money: $97,414

Singles
- Career record: 7-8 (at ATP Tour level, Grand Slam level, and in Davis Cup)
- Highest ranking: No. 288 (29 August 2022)

Grand Slam singles results
- French Open Junior: 1R (2014)
- Wimbledon Junior: 1R (2014)
- US Open Junior: 1R (2014)

Doubles
- Career record: 0–1 (at ATP Tour level, Grand Slam level, and in Davis Cup)
- Career titles: 0
- Highest ranking: No. 345 (2 March 2020)

Grand Slam doubles results
- French Open Junior: 2R (2014)
- Wimbledon Junior: 2R (2014)
- US Open Junior: 1R (2014)

Team competitions
- Davis Cup: 7-6
- Last updated on: 30 November 2024.

Nicolás Álvarez (Spanish pronunciation: [nikoˈlas ˈalβaɾes]; born 8 June 1996) is a Peruvian tennis inactive player. He has a career high ATP singles ranking of world No. 288 achieved on 29 August 2022. He also has a career high ATP doubles ranking of No. 345, achieved on 2 March 2020.

Álvarez has represented Peru at Davis Cup. In Davis Cup he has a win–loss record of 6–5.

On the junior tour, Álvarez had a career high ITF junior ranking of No. 17 achieved in March 2014.

== Challenger and Futures/World Tennis Tour Finals ==
=== Singles: 9 (4-5) ===
Legend (singles) ATP Challenger Tour (0-0) ITF Futures/World Tennis Tour (4-5)	Titles by Surface Hard (1-2) Clay (3-3) Grass (0–0) Carpet (0–0)

Result	W–L	Date	Tournament	Tier	Surface	Opponent	Score
Loss	0-1	Dec 2017	Peru F1, Lima	Futures	Clay	(Colombia) Daniel Elahi Galán	5–7, 3–6
Win	1-1	Aug 2018	Usa F21, Decatur	Futures	Hard	(United States) Sebastian Korda	6–4, 3–6, 6–3
Loss	1-2	Sep 2018	Argentina F5, Villa del Dique	Futures	Clay	(Argentina) Camilo Ugo Carabelli	2–6, 6–7^{(1-7)}
Win	2-2	Jan 2019	M25, Palm Coast, USA	World Tennis Tour	Clay	(United States) Sekou Bangoura	7–6^{(7-5)}, 1–6, 6–4
Loss	2-3	Apr 2019	M15, Cancún, Mexico	World Tennis Tour	Hard	(United States) Jordi Arconada	4–6, 2–6
Loss	2-4	Jul 2019	M25, Lima, Peru	World Tennis Tour	Clay	(Argentina) Francisco Cerúndolo	2–6, 1–6
Win	3-4	Aug 2019	M25+H, Bydgoszcz, Poland	World Tennis Tour	Clay	(Poland) Daniel Michalski	7–5, 6–3
Win	4-4	Nov 2019	M25, Orlando, USA	World Tennis Tour	Clay	(Brazil) Pedro Sakamoto	3–6, 6–2, 6–1
Loss	4-5	Feb 2022	M25, Campos Do Jordao, Brazil	World Tennis Tour	Hard	(Brazil) Mateus Alves	1-6, 4-6

=== Doubles 7 (2–5) ===
Legend
Challengers 0 (0–0)
Futures 7 (2–5)

Outcome	No.	Date	Tournament	Surface	Partner	Opponents	Score
Runner-up	1.	August 24, 2013	Guayaquil, Ecuador F2	Hard	(Peru) Duilio Beretta	(Ecuador) Emilio Gómez (Ecuador) Roberto Quiroz	1–6, 4–6
Winner	2.	August 12, 2018	(United States) Edwardsville, USA F22	Hard	(Italy) Liam Caruana	(United States) Nicolas Meister (United States) Evan Zhu	6–7^{(6–8)}, 7–6^{(7–3)}, [10–7]
Runner-up	3.	January 27, 2019	(United States) M25 Palm Coast, USA	Clay	(Mexico) Luis Patiño	(Colombia) Alejandro Gómez (United States) Junior Alexander Ore	6–7^{(2–7)}, 3–6
Runner-up	4.	July 14, 2019	M15 Buenos Aires, Argentina	Clay	(Bolivia) Sebastián Eguez	(Argentina) Leonardo Aboian (Argentina) Juan Pablo Grassi Mazzuchi	3–6, 3–6
Runner-up	5.	September 7, 2019	M25 Oviedo, Spain	Clay	(Argentina) Juan Pablo Ficovich	(Brazil) Daniel Dutra da Silva (Brazil) Pedro Sakamoto	7–6^{(7–3)}, 6–7^{(4–7)}, [5–10]
Winner	6.	November 17, 2019	(United States) M25 Orlando, USA	Clay	(Brazil) Pedro Sakamoto	(United States) Charlie Emhardt (United States) Alfredo Perez	7–6^{(7–3)}, 4–6, [10–8]
Runner-up	7.	February 16, 2020	M25 Lima, Peru	Clay	(Peru) Jorge Panta	(Peru) Sergio Galdós (Peru) Conner Huertas del Pino	4–6, 6–4, [5–10]

== Davis Cup ==
=== Participations: (7–6) ===
Group membership World Group (0–0) WG play-off (0–0) Group I (1–5) Group II (6–1) Group III (0–0) Group IV (0–0)	Matches by surface Hard (2–4) Clay (5–2) Grass (0–0) Carpet (0–0)	Matches by type Singles (7–5) Doubles (0–1)

- ▲ ▼ indicates the outcome of the Davis Cup match followed by the score, date, place of event, the zonal classification and its phase, and the court surface.

Rubber outcome	No.	Rubber	Match type (partner if any)	Opponent nation	Opponent player(s)	Score
▲4–1; 15–17 July 2016; Club Tennis Las Terrazas Miraflores, Lima, Peru; Americas Zone Group II second round; clay surface
Victory	1	II	Singles	Mexico	Lucas Gómez	6–3, 6–4, 6–3
Victory	2	V	Singles (dead rubber)	Mexico	Luis Patiño	6–4, 6–7^{(2–7)}, 6–3
▲3–2; 16–18 September 2016; Club Tennis Las Terrazas Miraflores, Lima, Peru; Americas Zone Group II promotional play-off; clay surface
Victory	3	II	Singles	Venezuela	Ricardo Rodríguez	6–4, 6–2, 6–0
Victory	4	V	Singles	Venezuela	Luis David Martínez	4–6, 6–4, 7–6^{(7–2)}, 6–1
▼1–4; 15–17 September 2017; Centro De Tenis Parque Del Este, Santo Domingo, Dominican Republic; Americas Zone Group I relegation play-off; hard surface
Defeat	5	I	Singles	Dominican Republic	Víctor Estrella Burgos	0–6, 3–6, 4–6
Defeat	6	III	Doubles (with Sergio Galdós)	Dominican Republic	Roberto Cid Subervi / Víctor Estrella Burgos	6–3, 4–6, 3–6, 6–1, 3–6
Defeat	7	V	Singles (dead rubber)	Dominican Republic	José Hernández-Fernández	2–6, 6–7^{(3–7)}
▼1–3; 7–8 April 2018; Club Deportivo la Asunción, Metepec, Mexico; Americas Zone Group II second round; hard surface
Victory	8	II	Singles	Mexico	Luis Patiño	6–3, 3–6, 6–4
▲3–2; 5–6 April 2019; Complejo Polideportivo de Ciudad Merliot, Santa Tecla, El Salvador; Americas Zone Group II first round; hard surface
Defeat	9	II	Singles	El Salvador	Marcelo Arévalo	4–6, 2–6
Victory	10	V	Singles	El Salvador	Kyle Johnson	6–3, 6–2
▲3–1; 6–7 March 2020; Club Lawn Tennis de la Exposición, Lima, Peru; World Group I Qualification; clay surface
Defeat	11	II	Singles	Switzerland	Henri Laaksonen	4–6, 4–6
▲3–2; 17–18 September 2021; Club Lawn Tennis de la Exposición, Lima, Peru; World Group I first round; clay surface
Defeat	12	I	Singles	Bosnia and Herzegovina	Damir Džumhur	2–6, 7–6^{(7–4)}, 3–6
Victory	13	V	Singles	Bosnia and Herzegovina	Nerman Fatić	7–6^{(7–4)}, 6–4
