= Kyle Johnson (tennis) =

American tennis player

- Country (sports): United States; El Salvador (in Davis Cup)
- Residence: Charlotte, North Carolina, United States
- Born: 30 September 1993 (age 32)
- College: DePaul University (2012–2016)
- Prize money: $144

Singles
- Career record: 0–1 (at ATP Tour level, Grand Slam level, and in Davis Cup)
- Career titles: 0

Doubles
- Career record: 0–0 (at ATP Tour level, Grand Slam level, and in Davis Cup)
- Career titles: 0

Team competitions
- Davis Cup: 0–1
- Last updated on: 1 July 2019.

Kyle Johnson (born 30 September 1993) is an American tennis player, who also represented El Salvador at the Davis Cup because of his maternal Salvadoran roots. In Davis Cup competition, he has a win-loss record of 0–1.

Johnson studied and played collegiately at DePaul University, between 2012 and 2016.

== Davis Cup ==
=== Participations: (0–1) ===
Group membership World Group (0–0) WG Play-off (0–0) Group I (0–0) Group II (0–1) Group III (0–0) Group IV (0–0)	Matches by surface Hard (0–1) Clay (0–0) Grass (0–0) Carpet (0–0)	Matches by type Singles (0–1) Doubles (0–0)

- ▲ ▼ indicates the outcome of the Davis Cup match followed by the score, date, place of event, the zonal classification and its phase, and the court surface.

Rubber outcome	No.	Rubber	Match type (partner if any)	Opponent nation	Opponent player(s)	Score
▼2–3; 5–6 April 2019; Complejo Polideportivo de Ciudad Merliot, Santa Tecla, El Salvador; Americas Zone Group II First round; Hard surface
Defeat	1	V	Singles	Peru	Nicolás Álvarez	3–6, 2–6
