= Christopher Díaz Figueroa =

Guatemalan tennis player

- Full name: Christopher Moisés Díaz Figueroa
- Country (sports): Guatemala
- Residence: Guatemala City, Guatemala
- Born: March 14, 1990 (age 36) Guatemala City, Guatemala
- Plays: Right-handed (two-handed backhand)
- Prize money: $114,826

Singles
- Career record: 14-14
- Career titles: 0; 0 Challenger, 5 Futures
- Highest ranking: No. 326 (31 October 2011)

Doubles
- Career record: 4–8
- Career titles: 0; 0 Challenger, 27 Futures
- Highest ranking: No. 267 (1 Oct 2018)
Medal record
Men's tennis
Representing Guatemala
Bolivarian Games
Bronze medal – third place	2013 Trujillo	Mixed doubles
Central American and Caribbean Games
Silver medal – second place	2014 Veracruz	Team Event
- Last updated on: May 20, 2021.

Christopher Moisés Díaz Figueroa (born 14 March 1990) is a professional tennis player from Guatemala.

Díaz Figueroa has a career high ATP singles ranking of World No. 326, achieved on 31 October 2011. He also has a career high ATP doubles ranking of World No. 267, achieved on 1 October 2018.

He has reached 23 career singles finals, with a record of 5 wins and 17 losses, all occurring on the ITF Futures Tour. Additionally, he has reached 50 doubles finals, with a record of 27 wins and 23 losses which includes an 0–1 record in ATP Challenger Tour finals.

Díaz Figueroa has represents his native Guatemala whilst participating in the Davis Cup. He has a record of 14 wins and 14 losses in singles matches and 4 wins, 8 losses in doubles matches to make his total Davis cup record equaling 18–22.

His coaches are Celestino Diaz & Ruben Puerta. He is currently serving a two-year ban for match fixing which was implemented in 2018.

== ATP Challenger and ITF Futures finals ==
=== Singles: 22 (5–17) ===
Legend ATP Challenger (0–0) ITF Futures (5–17)	Finals by surface Hard (5–15) Clay (0–2) Grass (0–0) Carpet (0–0)

Result	W–L	Date	Tournament	Tier	Surface	Opponent	Score
Loss	0–1	Oct 2010	Venezuela F6, Higuerote	Futures	Hard	(United States) Gregory Ouellette	3–6, 2–6
Loss	0–2	Dec 2010	Cuba F1, Havana	Futures	Hard	(Latvia) Deniss Pavlovs	2–6, 1–6
Win	1–2	Jan 2011	Guatemala F1, Guatemala City	Futures	Hard	(Mexico) Manuel Sánchez	6–2, 4–6, 7–6^{(7–4)}
Loss	1–3	May 2011	Mexico F4, Guadalajara	Futures	Hard	(Uruguay) Marcel Felder	3–6, 2–6
Win	2–3	Oct 2011	Mexico F13, Monterrey	Futures	Hard	(United States) Adam El Mihdawy	6–3, 3–6, 6–1
Win	3–3	May 2012	Mexico F5, Celaya	Futures	Hard	(Mexico) Miguel Gallardo Valles	6–2, 6–0
Loss	3–4	Jun 2013	Mexico F10, Quintana Roo	Futures	Hard	(Brazil) Bruno Sant'Anna	1–6, 2–6
Win	4–4	Oct 2013	Mexico F14, Pachuca	Futures	Hard	(Colombia) Felipe Mantilla	6–3, 4–6, 6–4
Loss	4–5	Feb 2014	Guatemala F1, Guatemala City	Futures	Hard	(Spain) Enrique López Pérez	3–6, 6–0, 4–6
Loss	4–6	May 2014	Mexico F3, Mexico City	Futures	Hard	(United States) Kevin King	1–6, 2–6
Win	5–6	Aug 2014	Mexico F10, Puebla	Futures	Hard	(Mexico) Luis Patino	6–0, 6–4
Loss	5–7	Sep 2014	Bolivia F1, Cochabamba	Futures	Clay	(Japan) Ryusei Makiguchi	6–7^{(2–7)}, 6–1, 4–6
Loss	5–8	Oct 2014	Bolivia F3, Santa Cruz	Futures	Clay	(Bolivia) Hugo Dellien	3–6, 4–6
Loss	5–9	Feb 2015	Guatemala F1, Guatemala City	Futures	Hard	(El Salvador) Marcelo Arévalo	3–6, 1–6
Loss	5–10	Jun 2015	Mexico F6, Manzanillo	Futures	Hard	(Mexico) Tigre Hank	6–4, 4–6, 5–7
Loss	5–11	Dec 2015	Honduras F1, San Pedro Sula	Futures	Hard	(El Salvador) Marcelo Arévalo	walkover
Loss	5–12	Mar 2016	Greece F1, Heraklion	Futures	Hard	(Czech Republic) Dominik Kellovský	6–7^{(2–7)}, 4–6
Loss	5–13	May 2016	Mexico F4, Morelia	Futures	Hard	(Ecuador) Roberto Quiroz	5–7, 5–7
Loss	5–14	May 2017	Nigeria F3, Abuja	Futures	Hard	(France) Calvin Hemery	7–6^{(7–2)}, 3–6, 1–6
Loss	5–15	Jul 2017	Colombia F1, Valledupar	Futures	Hard	(Colombia) Daniel Elahi Galán	3–6, 5–7
Loss	5–16	May 2018	Mexico F1, Morelia	Futures	Hard	(Bolivia) Federico Zeballos	3–6, 2–6
Loss	5–17	May 2018	Mexico F3, Córdoba	Futures	Hard	(United States) Adam El Mihdawy	6–3, 4–6, 5–7

=== Doubles: 50 (27–23) ===
Legend ATP Challenger (0–1) ITF Futures (27–22)	Finals by surface Hard (18–10) Clay (9–13) Grass (0–0) Carpet (0–0)

Result	W–L	Date	Tournament	Tier	Surface	Partner	Opponents	Score
Loss	0–1	Aug 2009	Venezuela F6, Caracas	Futures	Hard	(El Salvador) Marcelo Arévalo	(Colombia) Michael Quintero Aguilar (Venezuela) Yohny Romero	3–6, 6–7^{(5–7)}
Loss	0–2	Aug 2009	Ecuador F2, Guayaquil	Futures	Clay	(El Salvador) Marcelo Arévalo	(Ecuador) Diego Acosta (Ecuador) Patricio Alvarado	6–3, 4–6, [10–12]
Loss	0–3	Aug 2009	Ecuador F3, Quito	Futures	Clay	(El Salvador) Marcelo Arévalo	(United States) Christian Guevara (United States) Maciek Sykut	4–6, 4–6
Loss	0–4	Nov 2009	El Salvador F2, Santa Tecla	Futures	Clay	(Guatemala) Julen Uriguen	(El Salvador) Marcelo Arévalo (El Salvador) Rafael Arévalo	6–7^{(5–7)}, 4–6
Loss	0–5	Aug 2010	Mexico F5, Zacatecas	Futures	Hard	(Mexico) Bruno Rodríguez	(Mexico) César Ramírez (Mexico) Juan Manuel Elizondo	4–6, 7–6^{(7–2)}, [4–10]
Win	1–5	Sep 2010	Bolivia F2, La Paz	Futures	Clay	(Peru) Francisco Carbajal	(Bolivia) Hugo Dellien (Bolivia) Federico Zeballos	6–2, 6–3
Loss	1–6	Dec 2010	Mexico F12, Guerrero	Futures	Clay	(Ecuador) Iván Endara	(Mexico) Luis Díaz Barriga (Mexico) Miguel Ángel Reyes-Varela	2–6, 3–6
Loss	1–7	May 2011	Mexico F3, Mexico City	Futures	Hard	(Mexico) Miguel Gallardo Valles	(Barbados) Darian King (Barbados) Haydn Lewis	3–6, 4–6
Win	2–7	Jun 2011	Mexico F5, Celaya	Futures	Hard	(Uruguay) Marcel Felder	(Mexico) Luis Díaz Barriga (Mexico) Miguel Ángel Reyes-Varela	3–6, 6–3, [10–5]
Loss	2–8	Sep 2011	Mexico F10, Zacatecas	Futures	Hard	(Guatemala) Sebastien Vidal	(El Salvador) Marcelo Arévalo (Mexico) César Ramírez	3–6, 2–6
Loss	2–9	Jan 2012	Mexico F1, Monterrey	Futures	Hard	(Moldova) Roman Borvanov	(United States) Devin Britton (United States) Austin Krajicek	2–6, 3–6
Loss	2–10	Feb 2012	Panama F1, Panama City	Futures	Clay	(Guatemala) Sebastien Vidal	(El Salvador) Marcelo Arévalo (Mexico) César Ramírez	1–6, 4–6
Loss	2–11	Sep 2012	Mexico F10, Manzanillo	Futures	Hard	(Barbados) Darian King	(El Salvador) Marcelo Arévalo (Mexico) Miguel Ángel Reyes-Varela	1–6, 5–7
Loss	2–12	Sep 2012	Bolivia F3, La Paz	Futures	Clay	(Colombia) Sebastian Serrano	(Argentina) Facundo Mena (Peru) Rodrigo Sánchez	6–7^{(5–7)}, 6–7^{(6–8)}
Win	3–12	Oct 2012	Bolivia F4, La Paz	Futures	Clay	(Colombia) Sebastian Serrano	(Bolivia) Federico Zeballos (Bolivia) Mauricio Estívariz	7–5, 7–5
Win	4–12	Nov 2012	Mexico F12, Cancún	Futures	Hard	(New Zealand) Marvin Barker	(Switzerland) Riccardo Maiga (Mexico) Roberto Marcora	6–4, 6–2
Loss	4–13	Nov 2012	Mexico F13, Merida	Futures	Hard	(Dominican Republic) José Hernández-Fernández	(Switzerland) Riccardo Maiga (Mexico) Roberto Marcora	1–6, 6–2, [7–10]
Win	5–13	Feb 2013	Mexico F3, Mexico City	Futures	Hard	(Colombia) Nicolás Barrientos	(Moldova) Roman Borvanov (United States) Adam El Mihdawy	7–5, 7–6^{(8–6)}
Win	6–13	Feb 2013	Mexico F4, Tehuacan	Futures	Hard	(Moldova) Roman Borvanov	(Mexico) Alan Nunez Aguilera (Mexico) Miguel Ángel Reyes-Varela	7–6^{(7–2)}, 6–2
Win	7–13	May 2013	Guatemala F1, Guatemala City	Futures	Hard	(El Salvador) Marcelo Arévalo	(Moldova) Roman Borvanov (United States) Vahid Mirzadeh	6–2, 7–6^{(7–0)}
Loss	7–14	Sep 2013	Quito, Ecuador	Challenger	Clay	(Colombia) Carlos Salamanca	(United States) Kevin King (Colombia) Juan Carlos Spir	5–7, 7–6^{(11–9)}, [9–11]
Win	8–14	Oct 2013	Mexico F14, Pachuca	Futures	Hard	(Barbados) Darian King	(South Africa) Dean O'Brien (Colombia) Juan Carlos Spir	6–4, 2–6, [10–8]
Win	9–14	Feb 2014	Guatemala F1, Guatemala City	Futures	Hard	(El Salvador) Marcelo Arévalo	(Ecuador) Emilio Gómez (Venezuela) Luis David Martinez	6–3, 7–6^{(7–5)}
Loss	9–15	Jul 2014	Venezuela F3, Maracaibo	Futures	Hard	(Peru) Mauricio Echazú	(Argentina) Mateo Nicolas Martinez (Ecuador) Roberto Quiroz	4–6, 1–1 ret.
Loss	9–16	Sep 2014	Bolivia F2, La Paz	Futures	Clay	(Mexico) Luis Patino	(Peru) Duilio Vallebuona (Argentina) Franco Feitt	5–7, 0–6
Loss	9–17	Oct 2014	Bolivia F3, La Paz	Futures	Clay	(Mexico) Luis Patino	(Argentina) Maximiliano Estévez (Argentina) Franco Feitt	6–7^{(7–9)}, 5–7
Win	10–17	Nov 2014	Mexico F12, Huatulco	Futures	Hard	(Mexico) Luis Patino	(Argentina) Agustín Velotti (Venezuela) David Souto	6–3, 3–6, [10–6]
Win	11–17	Nov 2014	Mexico F13, Mazatlán	Futures	Hard	(Mexico) Luis Patino	(United States) Andre Dome (United States) Oscar Fabian Matthews	7–5, 6–3
Win	12–17	Sep 2015	Bolivia F2, La Paz	Futures	Clay	(Argentina) Franco Feitt	(Peru) Mauricio Echazú (Peru) Jorge Brian Panta	2–6, 6–4, [10–8]
Loss	12–18	Nov 2015	Venezuela F3, Margarita Island	Futures	Hard	(Argentina) Franco Feitt	(Barbados) Darian King (Venezuela) Luis Fernando Ramirez	2–6, 6–3, [7–10]
Loss	12–19	Nov 2015	El Salvador F2, La Libertad	Futures	Hard	(El Salvador) Marcelo Arévalo	(Barbados) Darian King (Ecuador) Emilio Gómez	3–6, 6–7^{(10–12)}
Win	13–19	Nov 2015	Guatemala F2, Guatemala City	Futures	Hard	(El Salvador) Marcelo Arévalo	(Guatemala) Wilfredo Gonzalez (Poland) Piotr Lomacki	7–5, 6–2
Win	14–19	Dec 2015	Honduras F1, San Pedro Sula	Futures	Hard	(El Salvador) Marcelo Arévalo	(United States) Nicholas Reyes (Mexico) Ivar Jose Aramburu Contreras	6–2, 6–1
Loss	14–20	Jun 2016	Colombia F2, Barranquilla	Futures	Clay	(Guatemala) Wilfredo Gonzalez	(Mexico) Luis Patino (Ecuador) Roberto Quiroz	4–6, 6–7^{(7–9)}
Win	15–20	Aug 2016	Egypt F21, Sharm El Sheikh	Futures	Hard	(Brazil) Pedro Bernardi	(Czech Republic) Michal Konecny (Russia) Roman Safiullin	7–6^{(7–4)}, 6–7^{(2–7)}, [10–7]
Win	16–20	Nov 2016	El Salvador F2, La Libertad	Futures	Clay	(El Salvador) Marcelo Arévalo	(United States) Nicholas Reyes (Germany) Pirmin Haenle	6–0, 6–4
Win	17–20	Mar 2017	Turkey F8, Antalya	Futures	Hard	(Brazil) Pedro Bernardi	(Zimbabwe) Benjamin Lock (South Korea) Hong Seong Chan	2–6, 6–2, [12–10]
Loss	17–21	Mar 2017	Turkey F9, Antalya	Futures	Clay	(Brazil) Pedro Bernardi	(Brazil) Pedro Sakamoto (Poland) Kamil Majchrzak	2–6, 2–6
Loss	17–22	Aug 2017	Colombia F3, Pereira	Futures	Clay	(Mexico) Luis Patino	(Dominican Republic) José Olivares (Colombia) Daniel Elahi Galán	2–6, 3–6
Win	18–22	Sep 2017	Bolivia F1, La Paz	Futures	Clay	(Bolivia) Federico Zeballos	(Argentina) Juan Ignacio Galarza (Argentina) Matias Zukas	6–4, 6–3
Loss	18–23	Oct 2017	Bolivia F2, Cochabamba	Futures	Clay	(Bolivia) Federico Zeballos	(Bolivia) Hugo Dellien (Bolivia) Boris Arias	3–6, 3–6
Win	19–23	Oct 2017	Bolivia F3, Santa Cruz	Futures	Clay	(Argentina) Matias Zukas	(Argentina) Eduardo Agustin Torre (Chile) Juan Carlos Sáez	3–6, 6–2, [10–1]
Win	20–23	Nov 2017	Greece F10, Heraklion	Futures	Hard	(Turkey) Altuğ Çelikbilek	(Mexico) Lucas Gomez (Italy) Marco Bartolotti	6–2, 6–2
Win	21–23	Feb 2018	Egypt F6, Sharm El Sheikh	Futures	Hard	(Guatemala) Wilfredo Gonzalez	(Netherlands) Gijs Brouwer (Netherlands) Jelle Sels	6–4, 6–4
Win	22–23	Mar 2018	Egypt F7, Sharm El Sheikh	Futures	Hard	(Guatemala) Wilfredo Gonzalez	(Austria) Lucas Miedler (Belgium) Clement Geens	6–4, 1–6, [10–8]
Win	23–23	Mar 2018	Egypt F8, Sharm El Sheikh	Futures	Hard	(Guatemala) Wilfredo Gonzalez	(United States) Robert Galloway (Zimbabwe) Benjamin Lock	6–4, 4–6, [12–10]
Win	24–23	Jul 2018	Portugal F10, Setúbal	Futures	Hard	(Guatemala) Wilfredo Gonzalez	(Portugal) Nuno Borges (Portugal) Francisco Cabral	7–5, 2–6, [10–8]
Win	25–23	Jul 2018	Spain F18, Getxo	Futures	Clay	(Guatemala) Wilfredo Gonzalez	(Spain) Javier Barranco Cosano (Italy) Raúl Brancaccio	7–5, 3–6, [10–8]
Win	26–23	Sep 2018	Spain F27, Seville	Futures	Clay	(Guatemala) Wilfredo Gonzalez	(Brazil) Felipe Meligeni Alves (Brazil) Orlando Luz	4–6, 7–6^{(7–4)}, [10–5]
Win	27–23	Sep 2018	Spain F28, Madrid	Futures	Clay	(Guatemala) Wilfredo Gonzalez	(Spain) Sergio Martos Gornés (Italy) Raúl Brancaccio	3–6, 6–3, [10–6]
