= Rafael Arévalo =

Salvadoran tennis player (born 1986)

Rafael Arévalo González
- Country (sports): El Salvador
- Residence: Sonsonate, El Salvador
- Born: July 4, 1986 (age 40) Sonsonate, El Salvador
- Height: 1.80 m (5 ft 11 in)
- Turned pro: 2003
- Retired: 2019
- Plays: Right-handed (one-handed backhand)
- Prize money: $34,441

Singles
- Career record: 14–9
- Career titles: 0
- Highest ranking: No. 374 (August 18, 2008)

Other tournaments
- Olympic Games: 2R (2008)

Doubles
- Career record: 11–10
- Career titles: 0
- Highest ranking: No. 520 (February 27, 2006)
- Last updated on: 16 September 2017.

Rafael Arévalo González (Spanish pronunciation: [rafaˈel aˈɾeβalo ɣonˈsales]; (Note: In isolation, González is pronounced [ɡonˈsales].) born July 4, 1986) is a retired professional tennis player from El Salvador. The majority of Arévalo's professional career has been restricted to playing on the Futures (ITF) circuit, with a further 22 appearances for the El Salvador Davis Cup team; he also had modest success in the juniors, reaching a peak of No. 10 in 2004. However, in 2008, aided by the Salvadoran Tennis Federation (Federación Salvadoreña de Tenis), he was awarded an invitation to the 2008 Beijing Olympics tennis tournament. The Tripartite Commission, which issued the invitation, is composed of representatives from International Olympic Committee (IOC), National Olympic Committees (NOCs), and the International Tennis Federation (ITF). It is standard practice to award such invitations (of which there were two for the men's singles tennis event) to countries with small Olympic teams. Arévalo was the first player from El Salvador to represent the country in a tennis competition at the Olympics. Arévalo defeated South Korea's Lee Hyung-taik in three sets in the first round, before being beaten by Swiss World No. 1 Roger Federer in the second. Later that year, Arévalo won his only ATP Challenger Tour match, beating Borja Malo in Quito, before losing to Julio Cesar Campozano.

He is the brother of tennis player Marcelo Arévalo, with whom he plays on the El Salvador Davis Cup team.

He is known in his home city of Sonsonate as 'Cabeza de Cono', which translates to Conehead.

Arévalo played his last match at the 2019 Davis Cup where he partnered his brother, Marcelo, in a doubles match against Peru. Soon after, he became president of the El Salvador Davis Cup team.
