= Paraguay Davis Cup team =

Davis Cup team representing Paraguay

Paraguay Davis Cup Team
- Captain: Paulo Carvallo
- Nations Ranking: 67 ▼2 (20 September 2021)
- Colors: Red/White
- First year: 1931
- Years played: 35
- Ties played (W–L): 78 (41-37)
- Years in World Group: 7 (4-7)
- Most total wins: Ramón Delgado (53-21)
- Most singles wins: Ramón Delgado (39-9)
- Most doubles wins: Ramón Delgado (14-12)
- Best doubles team: Francisco González/Víctor Pecci (11-6)
- Most ties played: Ramón Delgado (28)
- Most years played: Ramón Delgado (16)

The Paraguay national tennis team represents Paraguay in Davis Cup tennis competition and are governed by the Asociación Paraguaya de Tenis.

Paraguay currently compete in Group II of the Americas Zone. They have played in the World Group on seven occasions, reaching the quarter-finals four times.

== History ==
Paraguay competed in its first Davis Cup in 1931. Their best result was reaching the World Group quarterfinals on four occasions, 1983–85 and 1987. Three of those ties went down to the deciding rubber.

=== Last tie ===
Paraguay lost to Barbados, and Mexico in the 2017 Davis Cup Americas Zone Group II, and was relegated to the 2018 Davis Cup Americas Zone Group III.

=== Next tie ===
Paraguay will play in the Group III of the Americas Zone in 2018.

== Current team (2022) ==
- Daniel Vallejo
- Juan Borba
- Martín Vergara
- Hernando Escurra

== See also ==
- Davis Cup
- Paraguay Billie Jean King Cup team
- Paraguay at the Hopman Cup
