= Wilfredo González =

Guatemalan tennis player

- Country (sports): Guatemala
- Born: 6 January 1993 (age 33) Guatemala City, Guatemala
- Plays: Right-handed (one-handed backhand)
- Prize money: $ 25,925

Singles
- Career record: 7–3
- Career titles: 0 ITF
- Highest ranking: No. 799 (30 July 2018)

Doubles
- Career record: 8–3
- Career titles: 0
- Highest ranking: No. 261 (29 October 2018)

Wilfredo González (born 6 January 1993) is a Guatemalan tennis player.

González has a career high ATP singles ranking of No. 799 achieved on 30 July 2018 and a career high ATP doubles ranking of No. 261 achieved on 29 October 2018.

He represents Guatemala at the Davis Cup where he has a W/L record of 15–6.
