= 2012 ITF Men's Circuit (July–September) =

The 2012 ITF Men's Circuit is the 2012 edition of the entry level tour for men's professional tennis, and is the third tier tennis tour below the Association of Tennis Professionals, World Tour and Challenger Tour. It is organised by the International Tennis Federation (ITF) who additionally organizes the ITF Women's Circuit which is an entry-level tour for women's professional tennis. Future tournaments are organized to offer either $10,000 or $15,000 in prize money and tournaments which offering hospitality to players competing in the main draw give additional ranking points which are valid under the ATP ranking system, and are to be organized by a national association or approved by the ITF Men's Circuit Committee.

== Point distribution ==
Tournament category	W	F	SF	QF	R16	R32
Futures 15,000+H	35	20	10	4	1	0
Futures 15,000	27	15	8	3	1	0
Futures 10,000+H	27	15	8	3	1	0
Futures 10,000	18	10	6	2	1	0

== Key ==
$15,000 tournaments
$10,000 tournaments

== Month ==
=== July ===
Week of	Tournament	Winner	Runners-up	Semifinalists	Quarterfinalists
July 2	Argentina F16 Futures; Arroyito, Argentina; Clay $10,000	(Argentina) Leandro Migani; 6–1, 6–1	(Argentina) Hernán Casanova	(Argentina) Juan Pablo Ortiz (Argentina) Juan Ignacio Londero	(Argentina) Gabriel Alejandro Hidalgo (Argentina) Juan Vázquez-Valenzuela (Argentina) Federico Coria (Argentina) Mauricio Pérez Mota
July 2	Argentina F16 Futures; Arroyito, Argentina; Clay $10,000	(Argentina) Leandro Migani (Argentina) Benjamin Tenti; 6–4, 6–4	(Argentina) Hernán Casanova (Argentina) Mariano Urli	(Argentina) Juan Pablo Ortiz (Argentina) Juan Ignacio Londero	(Argentina) Gabriel Alejandro Hidalgo (Argentina) Juan Vázquez-Valenzuela (Argentina) Federico Coria (Argentina) Mauricio Pérez Mota
July 2	Armenia F1 Futures; Yerevan, Armenia; Clay $15,000	(Belgium) Arthur De Greef; 6–0, 6–1	(Russia) Nikoloz Basilashvili	(Russia) Stanislav Vovk (Czech Republic) Jan Blecha	(Moldova) Andrei Ciumac (Slovakia) Marek Semjan (Ukraine) Oleksandr Nedovyesov (Russia) Ronald Slobodchikov
July 2	Armenia F1 Futures; Yerevan, Armenia; Clay $15,000	(Moldova) Andrei Ciumac (Ukraine) Oleksandr Nedovyesov; 6–3, 6–1	(Germany) Patrick Elias (Ukraine) Vladyslav Manafov	(Russia) Stanislav Vovk (Czech Republic) Jan Blecha	(Moldova) Andrei Ciumac (Slovakia) Marek Semjan (Ukraine) Oleksandr Nedovyesov (Russia) Ronald Slobodchikov
July 2	Belgium F2 Futures; Havré, Belgium; Clay $10,000	(Belgium) Yannik Reuter; 5–7, 7–6^{(10–8)}, 7–6^{(7–1)}	(Chile) Juan Carlos Sáez	(Venezuela) Ricardo Rodríguez (Kazakhstan) Denis Yevseyev	(Chile) Guillermo Hormazábal (Czech Republic) Jakub Lustyk (Belgium) Germain Gigounon (Slovakia) Michal Pažický
July 2	Belgium F2 Futures; Havré, Belgium; Clay $10,000	(United Kingdom) James Feaver (United Kingdom) Daniel Smethurst; 6–3, 6–7^{(5–7)}, [12–10]	(United Kingdom) Jack Carpenter (Slovakia) Michal Pažický	(Venezuela) Ricardo Rodríguez (Kazakhstan) Denis Yevseyev	(Chile) Guillermo Hormazábal (Czech Republic) Jakub Lustyk (Belgium) Germain Gigounon (Slovakia) Michal Pažický
July 2	Brazil F16 Futures; Jundiaí, Brazil; Clay $10,000	(Chile) Nicolás Gustavo Kauer; 6–2, 6–1	(Brazil) Daniel Dutra da Silva	(Brazil) Thales Turini (Brazil) Eduardo Dischinger	(Brazil) Charles Costa (Brazil) Diego Matos (Brazil) Fabrício Neis (Brazil) João Pedro Sorgi
July 2	Brazil F16 Futures; Jundiaí, Brazil; Clay $10,000	(Brazil) Diego Matos (Brazil) Caio Silva; 6–4, 6–2	(Brazil) Augusto Laranja (Brazil) Thales Turini	(Brazil) Thales Turini (Brazil) Eduardo Dischinger	(Brazil) Charles Costa (Brazil) Diego Matos (Brazil) Fabrício Neis (Brazil) João Pedro Sorgi
July 2	Canada F3 Futures; Kelowna, Canada; Hard $15,000	(United States) Nikita Kryvonos; 6–3, 4–6, 6–4	(United States) Nicolas Meister	(Canada) Érik Chvojka (United States) Greg Ouellette	(United States) Kyle McMorrow (United States) Will Gray (Canada) Philip Bester (Canada) Henry Choi
July 2	Canada F3 Futures; Kelowna, Canada; Hard $15,000	(Canada) Érik Chvojka (United States) Greg Ouellette; 7–6^{(10–8)}, 4–6, [10–8]	(Canada) Philip Bester (Canada) Kamil Pajkowski	(Canada) Érik Chvojka (United States) Greg Ouellette	(United States) Kyle McMorrow (United States) Will Gray (Canada) Philip Bester (Canada) Henry Choi
July 2	France F12 Futures; Montauban, France; Clay $15,000+H	(France) Pierre-Hugues Herbert; 7–6^{(10–8)}, 7–5	(France) David Guez	(France) Marc Gicquel (France) Lucas Pouille	(France) Nicolas Renavand (France) Florian Reynet (France) Laurent Recouderc (France) Armel Rancezot
July 2	France F12 Futures; Montauban, France; Clay $15,000+H	(France) Jonathan Eysseric (France) Nicolas Renavand; 6–7^{(3–7)}, 6–4, [11–9]	(France) Pierre-Hugues Herbert (France) Hugo Nys	(France) Marc Gicquel (France) Lucas Pouille	(France) Nicolas Renavand (France) Florian Reynet (France) Laurent Recouderc (France) Armel Rancezot
July 2	Germany F8 Futures; Kassel, Germany; Clay $15,000+H	(Belarus) Uladzimir Ignatik; 6–4, 7–6^{(7–3)}	(Czech Republic) Jan Minář	(Poland) Marcin Gawron (Croatia) Kristijan Mesaroš	(Austria) Philipp Oswald (Czech Republic) Marek Michalička (Germany) Kevin Krawietz (Germany) Robin Kern
July 2	Germany F8 Futures; Kassel, Germany; Clay $15,000+H	(Australia) Adam Hubble (New Zealand) José Statham; 6–3, 4–6, [10–8]	(Germany) Gero Kretschmer (Germany) Alex Satschko	(Poland) Marcin Gawron (Croatia) Kristijan Mesaroš	(Austria) Philipp Oswald (Czech Republic) Marek Michalička (Germany) Kevin Krawietz (Germany) Robin Kern
July 2	Great Britain F9 Futures; Manchester, United Kingdom; Grass $10,000	(France) Albano Olivetti; 7–5, 6–1	(United Kingdom) Josh Goodall	(Italy) Enrico Iannuzzi (United Kingdom) Tom Burn	(United Kingdom) Alexander Slabinsky (United Kingdom) Edward Corrie (United Kingdom) Lewis Burton (United Kingdom) Daniel Cox
July 2	Great Britain F9 Futures; Manchester, United Kingdom; Grass $10,000	(United Kingdom) Josh Goodall (United Kingdom) Marcus Willis; 6–2, 7–6^{(7–3)}	(United Kingdom) Tom Burn (United Kingdom) Daniel Evans	(Italy) Enrico Iannuzzi (United Kingdom) Tom Burn	(United Kingdom) Alexander Slabinsky (United Kingdom) Edward Corrie (United Kingdom) Lewis Burton (United Kingdom) Daniel Cox
July 2	Indonesia F2 Futures; Jakarta, Indonesia; Hard $15,000	(Japan) Yūichi Sugita; 6–2, 7–5	(Chinese Taipei) Chen Ti	(South Korea) Lim Yong-kyu (Indonesia) Christopher Rungkat	(South Korea) Kim Woo-ram (Japan) Junn Mitsuhashi (South Korea) Choi Dong-whee (Indonesia) Elbert Sie
July 2	Indonesia F2 Futures; Jakarta, Indonesia; Hard $15,000	(South Korea) Lim Yong-kyu (South Korea) Nam Ji-sung; 6–2, 6–0	(China) Gao Peng (China) Gao Wan	(South Korea) Lim Yong-kyu (Indonesia) Christopher Rungkat	(South Korea) Kim Woo-ram (Japan) Junn Mitsuhashi (South Korea) Choi Dong-whee (Indonesia) Elbert Sie
July 2	Italy F16 Futures; Bolzano, Italy; Clay $15,000	(Argentina) Nicolás Pastor; 6–4, 6–3	(Switzerland) Sandro Ehrat	(France) Jérôme Inzerillo (Slovakia) Norbert Gombos	(Italy) Emanuele Molina (Italy) Riccardo Bellotti (Germany) Moritz Baumann (Italy) Filippo Leonardi
July 2	Italy F16 Futures; Bolzano, Italy; Clay $15,000	(Argentina) Nicolás Pastor (Italy) Matteo Volante; 6–2, 3–6, [10–7]	(Italy) Francesco Borgo (Australia) Dane Propoggia	(France) Jérôme Inzerillo (Slovakia) Norbert Gombos	(Italy) Emanuele Molina (Italy) Riccardo Bellotti (Germany) Moritz Baumann (Italy) Filippo Leonardi
July 2	Netherlands F4 Futures; Middelburg, Netherlands; Clay $15,000	(Netherlands) Matwé Middelkoop; 4–6, 6–2, 6–3	(Belgium) Niels Desein	(Netherlands) Thiemo de Bakker (Japan) Taro Daniel	(Poland) Andriej Kapaś (Austria) Gerald Melzer (Finland) Timo Nieminen (Spain) Guillermo Olaso
July 2	Netherlands F4 Futures; Middelburg, Netherlands; Clay $15,000	(Germany) Maximilian Dinslaken (Germany) George von Massow; 6–2, 6–1	(Australia) Alex Bucewicz (Belgium) Cedric De Zutter	(Netherlands) Thiemo de Bakker (Japan) Taro Daniel	(Poland) Andriej Kapaś (Austria) Gerald Melzer (Finland) Timo Nieminen (Spain) Guillermo Olaso
July 2	Romania F5 Futures; Bucharest, Romania; Clay $10,000	(Spain) Jordi Samper Montaña; 6–3, 3–6, 7–6^{(7–5)}	(Greece) Theodoros Angelinos	(Spain) Marc Giner (Romania) Teodor-Dacian Crăciun	(Spain) Carlos Boluda-Purkiss (Romania) Andrei Mlendea (Denmark) Søren Wedege (Italy) Alessandro Bega
July 2	Romania F5 Futures; Bucharest, Romania; Clay $10,000	(Greece) Theodoros Angelinos (Greece) Paris Gemouchidis; 5–7, 7–6^{(7–1)}, [10–3]	(Switzerland) Riccardo Maiga (Italy) Roberto Marcora	(Spain) Marc Giner (Romania) Teodor-Dacian Crăciun	(Spain) Carlos Boluda-Purkiss (Romania) Andrei Mlendea (Denmark) Søren Wedege (Italy) Alessandro Bega
July 2	Serbia F4 Futures; Belgrade, Serbia; Clay $10,000	(Serbia) Ivan Bjelica; 7–6^{(7–3)}, 6–4	(Serbia) Vladimir Obradović	(Spain) Carlos Gómez-Herrera (Bosnia and Herzegovina) Aldin Šetkić	(Slovenia) Nik Razboršek (Ukraine) Vadim Alekseenko (Czech Republic) Robin Bulant (Slovenia) Tomislav Ternar
July 2	Serbia F4 Futures; Belgrade, Serbia; Clay $10,000	(Bosnia and Herzegovina) Ismar Gorčić (Bosnia and Herzegovina) Aldin Šetkić; 4–6, 6–2, [10–4]	(Serbia) Ivan Bjelica (Croatia) Matej Sabanov	(Spain) Carlos Gómez-Herrera (Bosnia and Herzegovina) Aldin Šetkić	(Slovenia) Nik Razboršek (Ukraine) Vadim Alekseenko (Czech Republic) Robin Bulant (Slovenia) Tomislav Ternar
July 2	Spain F19 Futures; Bakio, Spain; Hard $10,000	(Australia) Brydan Klein; 6–2, 6–2	(France) Jules Marie	(France) Antoine Benneteau (Venezuela) David Souto	(Spain) Iván Arenas-Gualda (Spain) David Pérez Sanz (Spain) Juan-Samuel Arauzo-Martínez (France) Rudy Coco
July 2	Spain F19 Futures; Bakio, Spain; Hard $10,000	(Australia) Brydan Klein (France) Fabrice Martin; 7–5, 6–1	(Spain) Juan-Samuel Arauzo-Martínez (Spain) Íñigo Santos-Fernández	(France) Antoine Benneteau (Venezuela) David Souto	(Spain) Iván Arenas-Gualda (Spain) David Pérez Sanz (Spain) Juan-Samuel Arauzo-Martínez (France) Rudy Coco
July 2	Turkey F26 Futures; İzmir, Turkey; Clay $10,000	(Spain) Sergio Gutiérrez Ferrol; 6–1, 6–4	(Serbia) Miljan Zekić	(United Kingdom) Richard Gabb (Italy) Claudio Fortuna	(France) Davy Sum (Germany) Daniel Uhlig (Republic of Ireland) Daniel Glancy (Australia) Simon Ede
July 2	Turkey F26 Futures; İzmir, Turkey; Clay $10,000	(Germany) Dominik Schulz (Serbia) Miljan Zekić; 6–1, 6–2	(Russia) Sergei Krotiouk (Russia) Mikhail Vasiliev	(United Kingdom) Richard Gabb (Italy) Claudio Fortuna	(France) Davy Sum (Germany) Daniel Uhlig (Republic of Ireland) Daniel Glancy (Australia) Simon Ede
July 2	USA F18 Futures; Pittsburgh, United States; Clay $10,000	(United Kingdom) Alex Bogdanovic; 6–2, 6–4	(Australia) Matheson Klein	(United States) Chase Buchanan (Australia) Yuri Bezeruk	(United States) Joel Kielbowicz (United States) Bjorn Fratangelo (United States) Jason Tahir (Philippines) Ruben Gonzales
July 2	USA F18 Futures; Pittsburgh, United States; Clay $10,000	(United States) Michael Redlicki (United States) Jason Tahir; 7–6^{(7–4)}, 6–3	(Philippines) Ruben Gonzales (United States) Joel Kielbowicz	(United States) Chase Buchanan (Australia) Yuri Bezeruk	(United States) Joel Kielbowicz (United States) Bjorn Fratangelo (United States) Jason Tahir (Philippines) Ruben Gonzales
July 9	Argentina F17 Futures; Córdoba, Argentina; Clay $10,000	(Argentina) Leandro Migani; 6–1, 6–3	(Argentina) Andrés Molteni	(Italy) Federico Gaio (Argentina) Juan Ignacio Londero	(Argentina) Joaquín-Jesús Monteferrario (Argentina) Juan Pablo Paz (Argentina) Gabriel Alejandro Hidalgo (Argentina) Juan Vázquez-Valenzuela
July 9	Argentina F17 Futures; Córdoba, Argentina; Clay $10,000	(Argentina) Andrés Molteni (Argentina) Juan Vázquez-Valenzuela; 6–2, 6–2	(Ecuador) Diego Hidalgo (Argentina) Juan Ignacio Londero	(Italy) Federico Gaio (Argentina) Juan Ignacio Londero	(Argentina) Joaquín-Jesús Monteferrario (Argentina) Juan Pablo Paz (Argentina) Gabriel Alejandro Hidalgo (Argentina) Juan Vázquez-Valenzuela
July 9	Armenia F2 Futures; Yerevan, Armenia; Clay $15,000	(Ukraine) Oleksandr Nedovyesov; 4–6, 6–4, 7–5	(Russia) Stanislav Vovk	(Russia) Nikoloz Basilashvili (Belgium) Arthur De Greef	(Ukraine) Stanislav Poplavskyy (Moldova) Andrei Ciumac (Slovakia) Marek Semjan (Czech Republic) Jiří Školoudík
July 9	Armenia F2 Futures; Yerevan, Armenia; Clay $15,000	(Moldova) Andrei Ciumac (Ukraine) Oleksandr Nedovyesov; 6–4, 6–2	(Germany) Patrick Elias (Ukraine) Vladyslav Manafov	(Russia) Nikoloz Basilashvili (Belgium) Arthur De Greef	(Ukraine) Stanislav Poplavskyy (Moldova) Andrei Ciumac (Slovakia) Marek Semjan (Czech Republic) Jiří Školoudík
July 9	Austria F1 Futures; Telfs, Austria; Clay $10,000	(Austria) Marc Rath; 2–6, 6–3, 6–2	(Slovenia) Blaž Rola	(Austria) Nicolas Reissig (Austria) Lukas Jastraunig	(Italy) Francesco Picco (Austria) Pascal Brunner (Italy) Francesco Borgo (Germany) Peter Heller
July 9	Austria F1 Futures; Telfs, Austria; Clay $10,000	(Slovenia) Blaž Rola (Slovenia) Tomislav Ternar; 6–2, 7–5	(Austria) Stefan Hirn (Austria) Sebastian Stiefelmeyer	(Austria) Nicolas Reissig (Austria) Lukas Jastraunig	(Italy) Francesco Picco (Austria) Pascal Brunner (Italy) Francesco Borgo (Germany) Peter Heller
July 9	Belgium F3 Futures; Knokke, Belgium; Clay $10,000	(Belgium) Germain Gigounon; 6–4, 7–6^{(7–1)}	(Chile) Juan Carlos Sáez	(United Kingdom) Jack Carpenter (Netherlands Antilles) Alexander Blom	(Egypt) Sherif Sabry (Netherlands) Colin van Beem (France) Romain Bauvy (Germany) Lennart Zynga
July 9	Belgium F3 Futures; Knokke, Belgium; Clay $10,000	(Belgium) Joris De Loore (United Kingdom) Oliver Golding; 5–7, 7–6^{(7–3)}, [10–7]	(Netherlands Antilles) Alexander Blom (Australia) Thanasi Kokkinakis	(United Kingdom) Jack Carpenter (Netherlands Antilles) Alexander Blom	(Egypt) Sherif Sabry (Netherlands) Colin van Beem (France) Romain Bauvy (Germany) Lennart Zynga
July 9	Canada F4 Futures; Saskatoon, Canada; Hard $15,000	(New Zealand) Daniel King-Turner; 6–3, 6–3	(Australia) Matt Reid	(United States) Nicolas Meister (United States) Nikita Kryvonos	(Canada) Sam Garforth-Bles (Canada) Philip Bester (United States) Greg Ouellette (Brazil) Pedro Zerbini
July 9	Canada F4 Futures; Saskatoon, Canada; Hard $15,000	(United States) Nicolas Meister (Brazil) Pedro Zerbini; 3–6, 6–4, [12–10]	(Canada) Érik Chvojka (United States) Greg Ouellette	(United States) Nicolas Meister (United States) Nikita Kryvonos	(Canada) Sam Garforth-Bles (Canada) Philip Bester (United States) Greg Ouellette (Brazil) Pedro Zerbini
July 9	Czech Republic F4 Futures; Prostějov, Czech Republic; Clay $15,000	(Czech Republic) Jiří Veselý; 6–4, 6–4	(Austria) Dominic Thiem	(Czech Republic) Jan Kunčík (Slovakia) Adrian Sikora	(Czech Republic) Václav Šafránek (Czech Republic) Roman Jebavý (Poland) Maciej Smoła (Argentina) Juan-Pablo Amado
July 9	Czech Republic F4 Futures; Prostějov, Czech Republic; Clay $15,000	(Czech Republic) Adam Pavlásek (Czech Republic) Jiří Veselý; 7–6^{(7–2)}, 6–3	(Italy) Riccardo Bellotti (Austria) Dominic Thiem	(Czech Republic) Jan Kunčík (Slovakia) Adrian Sikora	(Czech Republic) Václav Šafránek (Czech Republic) Roman Jebavý (Poland) Maciej Smoła (Argentina) Juan-Pablo Amado
July 9	France F13 Futures; Bourg-en-Bresse, France; Clay $15,000+H	(France) Nicolas Renavand; 6–4, 7–6^{(7–5)}	(France) Jonathan Eysseric	(Algeria) Lamine Ouahab (France) Olivier Patience	(France) Alexandre Penaud (France) Simon Cauvard (France) David Guez (New Zealand) José Statham
July 9	France F13 Futures; Bourg-en-Bresse, France; Clay $15,000+H	(France) Olivier Patience (France) Nicolas Renavand; 6–4, 6–1	(France) Tom Jomby (France) Mick Lescure	(Algeria) Lamine Ouahab (France) Olivier Patience	(France) Alexandre Penaud (France) Simon Cauvard (France) David Guez (New Zealand) José Statham
July 9	Germany F9 Futures; Trier, Germany; Clay $10,000	(Germany) Sebastian Fanselow; 6–2, 6–4	(Germany) Maximilian Dinslaken	(Ukraine) Artem Smirnov (Russia) Ivan Nedelko	(Germany) Andre Begemann (Ukraine) Vladyslav Klymenko (Russia) Alexey Vatutin (Germany) Marc Meigel
July 9	Germany F9 Futures; Trier, Germany; Clay $10,000	(Germany) Maximilian Dinslaken (Germany) George von Massow; 7–6^{(7–0)}, 6–2	(Germany) Moritz Linhart (Germany) Julian Wenzel	(Ukraine) Artem Smirnov (Russia) Ivan Nedelko	(Germany) Andre Begemann (Ukraine) Vladyslav Klymenko (Russia) Alexey Vatutin (Germany) Marc Meigel
July 9	Great Britain F10 Futures; Ilkley, United Kingdom; Grass $10,000	(United Kingdom) Josh Goodall; 6–4, 6–1	(United Kingdom) Edward Corrie	(Australia) Andrew Whittington (France) Albano Olivetti	(United Kingdom) Daniel Cox (Australia) Michael Look (United Kingdom) Daniel Evans (United Kingdom) Andrew Fitzpatrick
July 9	Great Britain F10 Futures; Ilkley, United Kingdom; Grass $10,000	(United Kingdom) Lewis Burton (United Kingdom) Edward Corrie; 6–1, 6–1	(Australia) Andrew Harris (Australia) Andrew Whittington	(Australia) Andrew Whittington (France) Albano Olivetti	(United Kingdom) Daniel Cox (Australia) Michael Look (United Kingdom) Daniel Evans (United Kingdom) Andrew Fitzpatrick
July 9	Italy F17 Futures; Sassuolo, Italy; Clay $15,000	(Spain) José Checa Calvo; 6–2, 6–4	(Spain) Guillermo Olaso	(Italy) Filippo Leonardi (Argentina) Nicolás Pastor	(Italy) Matteo Civarolo (Italy) Riccardo Sinicropi (Italy) Davide Della Tommasina (Italy) Alessandro Bega
July 9	Italy F17 Futures; Sassuolo, Italy; Clay $15,000	(Italy) Filippo Leonardi (Italy) Jacopo Marchegiani; 6–0, 2–6, [10–7]	(Italy) Fabio Colangelo (Italy) Matteo Volante	(Italy) Filippo Leonardi (Argentina) Nicolás Pastor	(Italy) Matteo Civarolo (Italy) Riccardo Sinicropi (Italy) Davide Della Tommasina (Italy) Alessandro Bega
July 9	Kazakhstan F6 Futures; Almaty, Kazakhstan; Hard $15,000	(Ukraine) Illya Marchenko; 6–4, 6–2	(Belarus) Egor Gerasimov	(Russia) Denis Matsukevich (Belarus) Dzmitry Zhyrmont	(Chinese Taipei) Chen Ti (Uzbekistan) Sarvar Ikramov (South Korea) Na Jung-woong (Kazakhstan) Denis Yevseyev
July 9	Kazakhstan F6 Futures; Almaty, Kazakhstan; Hard $15,000	(Russia) Vitaliy Kachanovskiy (Uzbekistan) Vaja Uzakov; 6–3, 6–4	(Uzbekistan) Rifat Biktyakov (Kazakhstan) Denis Yevseyev	(Russia) Denis Matsukevich (Belarus) Dzmitry Zhyrmont	(Chinese Taipei) Chen Ti (Uzbekistan) Sarvar Ikramov (South Korea) Na Jung-woong (Kazakhstan) Denis Yevseyev
July 9	Romania F6 Futures; Pitești, Romania; Clay $10,000	(Romania) Petru-Alexandru Luncanu; 6–1, 1–6, 7–6^{(7–3)}	(Italy) Roberto Marcora	(Romania) Teodor-Dacian Crăciun (Italy) Salvatore Caruso	(Spain) Marc Giner (France) Maxime Forcin (Italy) Giulio Torroni (France) Thomas Giraudeau
July 9	Romania F6 Futures; Pitești, Romania; Clay $10,000	(Greece) Theodoros Angelinos (Greece) Paris Gemouchidis; 4–6, 7–6^{(10–8)}, [10–8]	(Romania) Robert Coman (Romania) Llaurentiu-Ady Gavrila	(Romania) Teodor-Dacian Crăciun (Italy) Salvatore Caruso	(Spain) Marc Giner (France) Maxime Forcin (Italy) Giulio Torroni (France) Thomas Giraudeau
July 9	Serbia F5 Futures; Belgrade, Serbia; Clay $10,000	(Serbia) Marko Djokovic; 4–1, retired	(Spain) Carlos Gómez-Herrera	(Serbia) Ilija Vučić (Bosnia and Herzegovina) Ismar Gorčić	(Serbia) Nikola Ćirić (Serbia) Nikola Bubnić (Serbia) Arsenije Zlatanović (Switzerland) Lucas Zweili
July 9	Serbia F5 Futures; Belgrade, Serbia; Clay $10,000	(Serbia) Marko Djokovic (United Kingdom) Matthew Short; 7–6^{(7–4)}, 7–5	(North Macedonia) Stefan Micov (Serbia) Bojan Zdravković	(Serbia) Ilija Vučić (Bosnia and Herzegovina) Ismar Gorčić	(Serbia) Nikola Ćirić (Serbia) Nikola Bubnić (Serbia) Arsenije Zlatanović (Switzerland) Lucas Zweili
July 9	Turkey F27 Futures; İzmir, Turkey; Clay $10,000	(Serbia) Miljan Zekić; 7–5, 6–1	(France) Romain Arneodo	(Bulgaria) Alexandar Lazov (Ukraine) Denys Mylokostov	(France) Martin Vaïsse (France) Yannick Jankovits (Germany) Dominik Schulz (Italy) Giovanni Zennaro
July 9	Turkey F27 Futures; İzmir, Turkey; Clay $10,000	(Germany) Dominik Schulz (Serbia) Miljan Zekić; 7–6^{(7–4)}, 6–4	(Italy) Nicola Ghedin (Italy) Giovanni Zennaro	(Bulgaria) Alexandar Lazov (Ukraine) Denys Mylokostov	(France) Martin Vaïsse (France) Yannick Jankovits (Germany) Dominik Schulz (Italy) Giovanni Zennaro
July 9	USA F19 Futures; Rochester, United States; Clay $10,000	(United Kingdom) Alex Bogdanovic; 6–3, 6–4	(United States) Chase Buchanan	(United States) Sekou Bangoura (France) Clément Reix	(United States) Evan King (New Zealand) Michael Venus (United States) Dennis Novikov (United States) Michael Redlicki
July 9	USA F19 Futures; Rochester, United States; Clay $10,000	(United States) Chase Buchanan (United States) Drew Courtney; 6–3, 6–0	(United States) Sekou Bangoura (United States) Vahid Mirzadeh	(United States) Sekou Bangoura (France) Clément Reix	(United States) Evan King (New Zealand) Michael Venus (United States) Dennis Novikov (United States) Michael Redlicki
July 16	Argentina F18 Futures; Bell Ville, Argentina; Clay $10,000	(Italy) Federico Gaio; 7–5, 7–5	(Argentina) Renzo Olivo	(Argentina) Guillermo Durán (Argentina) Leandro Migani	(Argentina) Juan Ignacio Londero (Ecuador) Diego Hidalgo (Argentina) Tomás Buchhass (Argentina) Hernán Casanova
July 16	Argentina F18 Futures; Bell Ville, Argentina; Clay $10,000	(Argentina) Guillermo Durán (Argentina) Renzo Olivo; 6–4, 7–5	(Uruguay) Martín Cuevas (Argentina) Juan Ignacio Londero	(Argentina) Guillermo Durán (Argentina) Leandro Migani	(Argentina) Juan Ignacio Londero (Ecuador) Diego Hidalgo (Argentina) Tomás Buchhass (Argentina) Hernán Casanova
July 16	Austria F2 Futures; Kramsach, Austria; Clay $10,000	(Austria) Nicolas Reissig; 6–3, 6–0	(Austria) Tristan-Samuel Weissborn	(Austria) Dennis Novak (Slovakia) Filip Horanský	(Austria) Maximilian Neuchrist (Austria) Patrick Ofner (Romania) Teodor-Dacian Crăciun (Slovenia) Tomislav Ternar
July 16	Austria F2 Futures; Kramsach, Austria; Clay $10,000	(Croatia) Mislav Hižak (Germany) Jeremy Jahn; 6–3, 4–6, [10–4]	(Moldova) Maxim Dubarenco (Austria) Dennis Novak	(Austria) Dennis Novak (Slovakia) Filip Horanský	(Austria) Maximilian Neuchrist (Austria) Patrick Ofner (Romania) Teodor-Dacian Crăciun (Slovenia) Tomislav Ternar
July 16	Belgium F4 Futures; Westende, Belgium; Hard $10,000	(France) Élie Rousset; 7–6^{(8–6)}, 1–6, 6–3	(Egypt) Sherif Sabry	(Australia) Thanasi Kokkinakis (Mexico) Mauricio Astorga	(United Kingdom) Oliver Golding (Germany) Marvin Netuschil (Chile) Juan Carlos Sáez (Belgium) Louis Cant
July 16	Belgium F4 Futures; Westende, Belgium; Hard $10,000	(Syria) Marc Abdulnour (France) Julien Maes; 6–2, 6–3	(Mexico) Mauricio Astorga (Mexico) Luis Patiño	(Australia) Thanasi Kokkinakis (Mexico) Mauricio Astorga	(United Kingdom) Oliver Golding (Germany) Marvin Netuschil (Chile) Juan Carlos Sáez (Belgium) Louis Cant
July 16	Czech Republic F5 Futures; Prague, Czech Republic; Clay $15,000	(Czech Republic) Jiří Veselý; 6–4, 6–0	(Slovakia) Norbert Gombos	(Czech Republic) Jan Šátral (Brazil) Thiago Monteiro	(Czech Republic) Adam Pavlásek (Czech Republic) Daniel Lustig (Austria) Marcus Weiglhofer (Spain) Roberto Carballés Baena
July 16	Czech Republic F5 Futures; Prague, Czech Republic; Clay $15,000	(Czech Republic) Roman Jebavý (Czech Republic) Jan Šátral; 6–1, 6–2	(Slovakia) Patrik Fabian (Slovakia) Adrian Partl	(Czech Republic) Jan Šátral (Brazil) Thiago Monteiro	(Czech Republic) Adam Pavlásek (Czech Republic) Daniel Lustig (Austria) Marcus Weiglhofer (Spain) Roberto Carballés Baena
July 16	Estonia F1 Futures; Tallinn, Estonia; Clay $15,000	(Croatia) Marin Bradarić; 6–4, 7–6^{(10–8)}	(France) Laurent Malouli	(Estonia) Vladimir Ivanov (Finland) Timo Nieminen	(Netherlands) Mark Vervoort (Italy) Giammarco Micolani (Sweden) Robin Olin (Finland) Max Wennakoski
July 16	Estonia F1 Futures; Tallinn, Estonia; Clay $15,000	(Netherlands) Jeroen Benard (Netherlands) Colin van Beem; 7–5, 7–5	(Belarus) Nikolai Fidirko (Estonia) Vladimir Ivanov	(Estonia) Vladimir Ivanov (Finland) Timo Nieminen	(Netherlands) Mark Vervoort (Italy) Giammarco Micolani (Sweden) Robin Olin (Finland) Max Wennakoski
July 16	France F14 Futures; Saint-Gervais, France; Clay $15,000	(France) Nicolas Renavand; 4–6, 7–6^{(7–1)}, 6–4	(France) Grégoire Burquier	(France) Nicolas Tourte (France) Hugo Nys	(France) Olivier Patience (France) Florent Diep (France) Kevin Botti (France) Laurent Lokoli
July 16	France F14 Futures; Saint-Gervais, France; Clay $15,000	(France) Kevin Botti (France) Grégoire Burquier; 7–5, 4–6, [12–10]	(France) Simon Cauvard (France) Nicolas Tourte	(France) Nicolas Tourte (France) Hugo Nys	(France) Olivier Patience (France) Florent Diep (France) Kevin Botti (France) Laurent Lokoli
July 16	Germany F10 Futures; Hanover, Germany; Clay $10,000	(Germany) George von Massow; 7–6^{(7–4)}, 7–6^{(9–7)}	(Germany) Tim Nekic	(Germany) Dominik Bartels (Spain) Enrique López Pérez	(Chile) Guillermo Hormazábal (Chile) Laslo Urrutia Fuentes (Germany) Jonas Lütjen (Germany) Timon Reichelt
July 16	Germany F10 Futures; Hanover, Germany; Clay $10,000	(Mexico) Alejandro Moreno Figueroa (Mexico) Miguel Ángel Reyes-Varela; 1–6, 6–3, [10–7]	(Germany) Maximilian Dinslaken (Germany) George von Massow	(Germany) Dominik Bartels (Spain) Enrique López Pérez	(Chile) Guillermo Hormazábal (Chile) Laslo Urrutia Fuentes (Germany) Jonas Lütjen (Germany) Timon Reichelt
July 16	Great Britain F11 Futures; Felixstowe, United Kingdom; Grass $10,000	(United Kingdom) Alexander Slabinsky; 7–5, 5–7, 6–4	(United Kingdom) Tom Burn	(New Zealand) Marcus Daniell (United Kingdom) Edward Corrie	(United Kingdom) Oliver Hudson (United Kingdom) Joshua Ward-Hibbert (United Kingdom) Matthew Short (United Kingdom) George Coupland
July 16	Great Britain F11 Futures; Felixstowe, United Kingdom; Grass $10,000	(United Kingdom) Lewis Burton (United Kingdom) Edward Corrie; 6–2, 6–2	(United Kingdom) Tom Burn (United Kingdom) Daniel Evans	(New Zealand) Marcus Daniell (United Kingdom) Edward Corrie	(United Kingdom) Oliver Hudson (United Kingdom) Joshua Ward-Hibbert (United Kingdom) Matthew Short (United Kingdom) George Coupland
July 16	India F10 Futures; Coimbatore, India; Hard $10,000	(South Korea) Jeong Suk-young; 6–2, 7–5	(India) Vijay Sundar Prashanth	(India) Karunuday Singh (India) Saketh Myneni	(India) Ranjeet Virali-Murugesan (Australia) Zach Itzstein (India) Ashwin Vijayragavan (South Korea) Seol Jae-min
July 16	India F10 Futures; Coimbatore, India; Hard $10,000	(India) Saketh Myneni (India) Arun-Prakash Rajagopalan; 6–3, 6–2	(India) Vijay Sundar Prashanth (India) Kaza Vinajak Sharma	(India) Karunuday Singh (India) Saketh Myneni	(India) Ranjeet Virali-Murugesan (Australia) Zach Itzstein (India) Ashwin Vijayragavan (South Korea) Seol Jae-min
July 16	Italy F18 Futures; Modena, Italy; Clay $15,000	(Italy) Viktor Galović; 4–6, 6–4, 7–6^{(7–4)}	(Italy) Enrico Fioravante	(Colombia) Óscar Rodríguez (Italy) Mauro Bosio	(Italy) Giacomo Oradini (Italy) Marco Viola (Italy) Pietro Rondoni (Georgia (country)) Aleksandre Metreveli
July 16	Italy F18 Futures; Modena, Italy; Clay $15,000	(Italy) Enrico Iannuzzi (Italy) Riccardo Sinicropi; 6–7^{(0–7)}, 7–6^{(7–3)}, [10–7]	(Italy) Massimo Capone (Italy) Enrico Fioravante	(Colombia) Óscar Rodríguez (Italy) Mauro Bosio	(Italy) Giacomo Oradini (Italy) Marco Viola (Italy) Pietro Rondoni (Georgia (country)) Aleksandre Metreveli
July 16	Kazakhstan F7 Futures; Astana, Kazakhstan; Hard $15,000	(Belarus) Dzmitry Zhyrmont; 6–1, 6–4	(Chinese Taipei) Chen Ti	(Belarus) Egor Gerasimov (Russia) Denis Matsukevich	(Uzbekistan) Sarvar Ikramov (Kazakhstan) Alexey Kedryuk (Kazakhstan) Denis Yevseyev (Uzbekistan) Rifat Biktyakov
July 16	Kazakhstan F7 Futures; Astana, Kazakhstan; Hard $15,000	(Kazakhstan) Alexey Kedryuk (Russia) Denis Matsukevich; 6–3, 6–3	(Israel) Dor Belfer (Israel) Tal Eros	(Belarus) Egor Gerasimov (Russia) Denis Matsukevich	(Uzbekistan) Sarvar Ikramov (Kazakhstan) Alexey Kedryuk (Kazakhstan) Denis Yevseyev (Uzbekistan) Rifat Biktyakov
July 16	Spain F20 Futures; Gandia, Spain; Clay $10,000	(Japan) Taro Daniel; 6–3, 6–4	(Spain) Marc Giner	(Spain) Albert Alcaraz Ivorra (Netherlands) Miliaan Niesten	(Spain) Marc Fornell Mestres (Spain) Miguel Ángel López Jaén (Spain) David Estruch (Venezuela) Ricardo Rodríguez
July 16	Spain F20 Futures; Gandia, Spain; Clay $10,000	(Spain) Juan-Samuel Arauzo-Martínez (Spain) David Pérez Sanz; 7–6^{(7–3)}, 7–5	(Russia) Aleksandr Lobkov (Russia) Alexander Rumyantsev	(Spain) Albert Alcaraz Ivorra (Netherlands) Miliaan Niesten	(Spain) Marc Fornell Mestres (Spain) Miguel Ángel López Jaén (Spain) David Estruch (Venezuela) Ricardo Rodríguez
July 16	Turkey F28 Futures; İzmir, Turkey; Clay $10,000	(France) Julien Demois; 6–3, 6–7^{(15–17)}, 6–4	(Bulgaria) Alexandar Lazov	(France) Yannick Jankovits (Italy) Edoardo Eremin	(France) Thomas Giraudeau (France) Maxime Forcin (Moldova) Andrei Ciumac (Italy) Omar Giacalone
July 16	Turkey F28 Futures; İzmir, Turkey; Clay $10,000	(Russia) Kirill Dmitriev (India) Ramkumar Ramanathan; 6–2, 6–2	(France) Julien Demois (France) Yanais Laurent	(France) Yannick Jankovits (Italy) Edoardo Eremin	(France) Thomas Giraudeau (France) Maxime Forcin (Moldova) Andrei Ciumac (Italy) Omar Giacalone
July 16	USA F20 Futures; Joplin, United States; Hard $10,000	(France) Sébastien Boltz; 6–3, 6–3	(Barbados) Darian King	(India) Sanam Singh (United States) Dane Webb	(United States) Kyle McMorrow (Australia) Yuri Bezeruk (Romania) Costin Pavăl (Haiti) Gonzales Austin
July 16	USA F20 Futures; Joplin, United States; Hard $10,000	(United States) Harrison Adams (United States) Shane Vinsant; 6–3, 2–6, [13–11]	(Australia) Yuri Bezeruk (Barbados) Darian King	(India) Sanam Singh (United States) Dane Webb	(United States) Kyle McMorrow (Australia) Yuri Bezeruk (Romania) Costin Pavăl (Haiti) Gonzales Austin
July 23	Austria F3 Futures; Bad Waltersdorf, Austria; Clay $10,000	(Slovenia) Blaž Rola; 6–3, 6–2	(Austria) Nicolas Reissig	(United Kingdom) Daniel Smethurst (Austria) Pascal Brunner	(Austria) Marcus Weiglhofer (United Kingdom) Alexander Slabinsky (Sweden) Markus Eriksson (Slovenia) Tomislav Ternar
July 23	Austria F3 Futures; Bad Waltersdorf, Austria; Clay $10,000	(Austria) Maximilian Neuchrist (Croatia) Mate Pavić; 6–4, 6–3	(United Kingdom) James Marsalek (United Kingdom) Daniel Smethurst	(United Kingdom) Daniel Smethurst (Austria) Pascal Brunner	(Austria) Marcus Weiglhofer (United Kingdom) Alexander Slabinsky (Sweden) Markus Eriksson (Slovenia) Tomislav Ternar
July 23	Belgium F5 Futures; Duinbergen, Belgium; Clay $10,000	(France) Olivier Patience; 6–4, 6–1	(France) Alexandre Penaud	(France) Tristan Lamasine (Belgium) Joris De Loore	(Italy) Francesco Picco (Chile) Juan Carlos Sáez (United Kingdom) Jack Carpenter (Spain) Dario Pérez
July 23	Belgium F5 Futures; Duinbergen, Belgium; Clay $10,000	(South Africa) Jean Andersen (Kuwait) Abdullah Maqdes; 6–3, 3–6, [12–10]	(Belgium) Joris De Loore (Chile) Juan Carlos Sáez	(France) Tristan Lamasine (Belgium) Joris De Loore	(Italy) Francesco Picco (Chile) Juan Carlos Sáez (United Kingdom) Jack Carpenter (Spain) Dario Pérez
July 23	Brazil F18 Futures; Pelotas, Brazil; Clay $10,000	(Brazil) Daniel Dutra da Silva; 6–3, 2–6, 6–3	(Argentina) Maximiliano Estévez	(Brazil) Ricardo Siggia (Brazil) Yuri Radomsky	(Brazil) Andre Napolitano (Brazil) Fabrício Neis (Argentina) Nicolás Kicker (Brazil) José Pereira
July 23	Brazil F18 Futures; Pelotas, Brazil; Clay $10,000	(Brazil) Fabrício Neis (Brazil) Thales Turini; 6–4, 6–2	(Brazil) Diego Matos (Brazil) José Pereira	(Brazil) Ricardo Siggia (Brazil) Yuri Radomsky	(Brazil) Andre Napolitano (Brazil) Fabrício Neis (Argentina) Nicolás Kicker (Brazil) José Pereira
July 23	Czech Republic F6 Futures; Liberec, Czech Republic; Clay $15,000	(Czech Republic) Adam Pavlásek; 3–6, 7–6^{(7–3)}, 6–0	(Czech Republic) Jiří Veselý	(Czech Republic) Roman Jebavý (Slovakia) Jozef Kovalík	(Czech Republic) Otakar Lucák (Brazil) Tiago Fernandes (Czech Republic) Jan Kunčík (Slovakia) Juraj Masár
July 23	Czech Republic F6 Futures; Liberec, Czech Republic; Clay $15,000	(Czech Republic) Jaroslav Pospíšil (Czech Republic) Jan Šátral; 6–2, 6–4	(Czech Republic) Tomáš Cakl (Czech Republic) Lubomír Majšajdr	(Czech Republic) Roman Jebavý (Slovakia) Jozef Kovalík	(Czech Republic) Otakar Lucák (Brazil) Tiago Fernandes (Czech Republic) Jan Kunčík (Slovakia) Juraj Masár
July 23	Estonia F2 Futures; Kuressaare, Estonia; Clay $10,000	(France) Laurent Recouderc; 7–5, 7–6^{(7–3)}	(Estonia) Vladimir Ivanov	(Italy) Damiano Di Ienno (France) Laurent Malouli	(Italy) Giorgio Portaluri (Switzerland) Joss Espasandin (Belarus) Nikolai Fidirko (Italy) Francesco Vilardo
July 23	Estonia F2 Futures; Kuressaare, Estonia; Clay $10,000	(Netherlands) Jeroen Benard (Netherlands) Mark Vervoort; 4–6, 7–6^{(7–4)}, [10–5]	(Estonia) Vladimir Ivanov (Russia) Ivan Nedelko	(Italy) Damiano Di Ienno (France) Laurent Malouli	(Italy) Giorgio Portaluri (Switzerland) Joss Espasandin (Belarus) Nikolai Fidirko (Italy) Francesco Vilardo
July 23	Germany F11 Futures; Dortmund, Germany; Clay $10,000	(Germany) Jan-Lennard Struff; 6–1, 6–4	(Germany) Matthias Wunner	(Germany) Ralph Regus (Germany) Maximilian Dinslaken	(New Zealand) Sebastian Lavie (Mexico) Miguel Ángel Reyes-Varela (Germany) Richard Waite (Germany) Dominik Schulz
July 23	Germany F11 Futures; Dortmund, Germany; Clay $10,000	(Mexico) Alejandro Moreno Figueroa (Mexico) Miguel Ángel Reyes-Varela; 4–6, 6–4, [10–7]	(Germany) Patrick Pradella (Germany) Jan-Lennard Struff	(Germany) Ralph Regus (Germany) Maximilian Dinslaken	(New Zealand) Sebastian Lavie (Mexico) Miguel Ángel Reyes-Varela (Germany) Richard Waite (Germany) Dominik Schulz
July 23	India F11 Futures; Chennai, India; Hard $10,000	(India) Saketh Myneni; 6–3, 2–6, 6–4	(South Korea) Jeong Suk-young	(South Korea) Nam Hyun-woo (India) Karunuday Singh	(India) Ranjeet Virali-Murugesan (Chinese Taipei) Wang Chieh-fu (France) Antoine Escoffier (India) Vijay Sundar Prashanth
July 23	India F11 Futures; Chennai, India; Hard $10,000	(Thailand) Weerapat Doakmaiklee (Thailand) Perakiat Siriluethaiwattana; 6–4, 2–6, [10–7]	(India) Saketh Myneni (India) Arun-Prakash Rajagopalan	(South Korea) Nam Hyun-woo (India) Karunuday Singh	(India) Ranjeet Virali-Murugesan (Chinese Taipei) Wang Chieh-fu (France) Antoine Escoffier (India) Vijay Sundar Prashanth
July 23	Ireland F1 Futures; Dublin, Ireland; Carpet $15,000	(United Kingdom) Josh Goodall; 7–6^{(8–6)}, 6–4	(Australia) Michael Look	(Republic of Ireland) James McGee (France) Albano Olivetti	(United Kingdom) Daniel Cox (New Zealand) Ben McLachlan (Spain) Rudy Coco (Greece) Alexandros Jakupovic
July 23	Ireland F1 Futures; Dublin, Ireland; Carpet $15,000	(France) Albano Olivetti (France) Élie Rousset; 6–3, 6–4	(Republic of Ireland) James McGee (Spain) Jaime Pulgar-García	(Republic of Ireland) James McGee (France) Albano Olivetti	(United Kingdom) Daniel Cox (New Zealand) Ben McLachlan (Spain) Rudy Coco (Greece) Alexandros Jakupovic
July 23	Italy F19 Futures; Fano, Italy; Clay $15,000+H	(Spain) José Checa Calvo; 6–4, 6–2	(Poland) Michał Przysiężny	(Serbia) Miljan Zekić (Australia) James Lemke	(Italy) Claudio Grassi (Germany) Moritz Baumann (Switzerland) Sandro Ehrat (Italy) Antonio Comporto
July 23	Italy F19 Futures; Fano, Italy; Clay $15,000+H	(Italy) Matteo Volante (Serbia) Miljan Zekić; 6–3, 7–6^{(7–3)}	(Italy) Stefano Napolitano (Italy) Marco Viola	(Serbia) Miljan Zekić (Australia) James Lemke	(Italy) Claudio Grassi (Germany) Moritz Baumann (Switzerland) Sandro Ehrat (Italy) Antonio Comporto
July 23	Serbia F6 Futures; Kikinda, Serbia; Clay $10,000	(Bosnia and Herzegovina) Aldin Šetkić; 6–1, 6–2	(Hungary) Viktor Filipenkó	(Serbia) Saša Stojisavljević (Serbia) Miki Janković	(Serbia) Nikola Ćaćić (Bulgaria) Dimitar Kuzmanov (Croatia) Marko Mijačević (France) Nicolas Rosenzweig
July 23	Serbia F6 Futures; Kikinda, Serbia; Clay $10,000	The event was cancelled due to bad weather.		(Serbia) Saša Stojisavljević (Serbia) Miki Janković	(Serbia) Nikola Ćaćić (Bulgaria) Dimitar Kuzmanov (Croatia) Marko Mijačević (France) Nicolas Rosenzweig
July 23	Spain F21 Futures; Dénia, Spain; Clay $10,000	(Venezuela) Ricardo Rodríguez; 3–6, 7–6^{(7–4)}, 6–1	(Venezuela) David Souto	(Spain) David Pérez Sanz (Spain) Marc Giner	(Spain) Ferran Ventura-Martell (Spain) Marc Fornell Mestres (Spain) David Estruch (Spain) Sergio Martos Gornés
July 23	Spain F21 Futures; Dénia, Spain; Clay $10,000	(Spain) Carlos Calderón-Rodríguez (Netherlands) Stephan Fransen; 7–5, 6–2	(Spain) Juan Lizariturry (Spain) Oriol Roca Batalla	(Spain) David Pérez Sanz (Spain) Marc Giner	(Spain) Ferran Ventura-Martell (Spain) Marc Fornell Mestres (Spain) David Estruch (Spain) Sergio Martos Gornés
July 23	Turkey F29 Futures; İzmir, Turkey; Clay $10,000	(Bulgaria) Alexandar Lazov; 1–6, 7–5, 7–6^{(7–5)}	(Italy) Edoardo Eremin	(Italy) Salvatore Caruso (Egypt) Karim-Mohamed Maamoun	(Croatia) Kristijan Mesaroš (France) Cedrick Commin (Moldova) Andrei Ciumac (Italy) Alessandro Colella
July 23	Turkey F29 Futures; İzmir, Turkey; Clay $10,000	(Ukraine) Volodymyr Uzhylovskyi (Ukraine) Maxim Zatulko; 6–2, 6–4	(Italy) Alessandro Colella (Italy) Federico Ottolini	(Italy) Salvatore Caruso (Egypt) Karim-Mohamed Maamoun	(Croatia) Kristijan Mesaroš (France) Cedrick Commin (Moldova) Andrei Ciumac (Italy) Alessandro Colella
July 23	USA F21 Futures; Godfrey, United States; Hard $10,000	(United States) Jason Jung; 2–6, 7–5, 6–2	(Mexico) César Ramírez	(United States) Dennis Nevolo (Brazil) Alex Blumenberg	(Latvia) Mārtiņš Podžus (United States) Stefan Kozlov (United States) Ryan Thacher (United States) Nick Chappell
July 23	USA F21 Futures; Godfrey, United States; Hard $10,000	(El Salvador) Marcelo Arévalo (United States) Ryan Rowe; 6–4, 6–4	(France) Sébastien Boltz (Switzerland) Luca Margaroli	(United States) Dennis Nevolo (Brazil) Alex Blumenberg	(Latvia) Mārtiņš Podžus (United States) Stefan Kozlov (United States) Ryan Thacher (United States) Nick Chappell
July 30	Austria F4 Futures; Fieberbrunn, Austria; Clay $10,000	(Austria) Nicolas Reissig; 6–4, 7–6^{(7–5)}	(New Zealand) José Statham	(Germany) David Thurner (Sweden) Christian Lindell	(Czech Republic) Michal Konečný (Austria) Christian Trubrig (Czech Republic) Michal Schmid (Croatia) Mate Pavić
July 30	Austria F4 Futures; Fieberbrunn, Austria; Clay $10,000	(Australia) Dane Propoggia (New Zealand) José Statham; 6–7^{(6–8)}, 7–5, [10–6]	(Austria) Maximilian Neuchrist (Croatia) Mate Pavić	(Germany) David Thurner (Sweden) Christian Lindell	(Czech Republic) Michal Konečný (Austria) Christian Trubrig (Czech Republic) Michal Schmid (Croatia) Mate Pavić
July 30	Belgium F6 Futures; Oostende, Belgium; Clay $10,000	(Belgium) Yannik Reuter; 6–3, 6–1	(Belgium) Kimmer Coppejans	(Belgium) Arthur De Greef (Belgium) Niels Desein	(France) Jonathan Eysseric (Belgium) Joris De Loore (France) Alexandre Sidorenko (France) Simon Cauvard
July 30	Belgium F6 Futures; Oostende, Belgium; Clay $10,000	(Belgium) Joris De Loore (Chile) Juan Carlos Sáez; 6–0, 6–4	(Belgium) Niels Desein (Belgium) James Junior Storme	(Belgium) Arthur De Greef (Belgium) Niels Desein	(France) Jonathan Eysseric (Belgium) Joris De Loore (France) Alexandre Sidorenko (France) Simon Cauvard
July 30	Brazil F19 Futures; Americana, Brazil; Hard $10,000	(Brazil) Tiago Lopes; 7–5, 7–6^{(7–2)}	(Brazil) Thales Turini	(Brazil) Nicolas Santos (Brazil) André Miele	(Brazil) Henrique Cunha (Brazil) Carlos Eduardo Severino (Brazil) Eduardo Dischinger (Brazil) Fabrício Neis
July 30	Brazil F19 Futures; Americana, Brazil; Hard $10,000	(Brazil) Diego Matos (Brazil) Caio Silva; 6–0, 7–6^{(7–2)}	(Brazil) Wilson Leite (Brazil) Carlos Eduardo Severino	(Brazil) Nicolas Santos (Brazil) André Miele	(Brazil) Henrique Cunha (Brazil) Carlos Eduardo Severino (Brazil) Eduardo Dischinger (Brazil) Fabrício Neis
July 30	Germany F12 Futures; Wetzlar, Germany; Clay $10,000	(Germany) Steven Moneke; 6–0, 6–2	(Argentina) Pablo Galdón	(Chile) Laslo Urrutia Fuentes (Germany) Jan-Lennard Struff	(Australia) Rameez Junaid (Germany) Andre Begemann (Germany) Tim Pütz (Germany) Sami Reinwein
July 30	Germany F12 Futures; Wetzlar, Germany; Clay $10,000	(Germany) Steven Moneke (Germany) Tim Pütz; 6–2, 6–0	(Germany) Andre Begemann (Mexico) Alejandro Moreno Figueroa	(Chile) Laslo Urrutia Fuentes (Germany) Jan-Lennard Struff	(Australia) Rameez Junaid (Germany) Andre Begemann (Germany) Tim Pütz (Germany) Sami Reinwein
July 30	Great Britain F12 Futures; Wrexham, United Kingdom; Hard $15,000	(United Kingdom) Josh Goodall; 6–3, 6–3	(France) Mathieu Rodrigues	(United Kingdom) Daniel Evans (United Kingdom) Andrew Fitzpatrick	(United Kingdom) Daniel Cox (United Kingdom) Joshua Milton (France) Antoine Benneteau (France) Yannick Jankovits
July 30	Great Britain F12 Futures; Wrexham, United Kingdom; Hard $15,000	(United Kingdom) Lewis Burton (United Kingdom) Edward Corrie; 6–4, 6–0	(United Kingdom) Oliver Golding (United Kingdom) Sean Thornley	(United Kingdom) Daniel Evans (United Kingdom) Andrew Fitzpatrick	(United Kingdom) Daniel Cox (United Kingdom) Joshua Milton (France) Antoine Benneteau (France) Yannick Jankovits
July 30	India F12 Futures; Chennai, India; Hard $10,000	(India) Saketh Myneni; 6–3, 6–2	(France) Antoine Escoffier	(India) Vijay Sundar Prashanth (South Korea) Nam Hyun-woo	(India) Jeevan Nedunchezhiyan (Thailand) Perakiat Siriluethaiwattana (India) Ajai Selvaraj (India) Arjun Kadhe
July 30	India F12 Futures; Chennai, India; Hard $10,000	(India) Saketh Myneni (India) Arun-Prakash Rajagopalan; 6–3, 6–4	(Thailand) Weerapat Doakmaiklee (Thailand) Perakiat Siriluethaiwattana	(India) Vijay Sundar Prashanth (South Korea) Nam Hyun-woo	(India) Jeevan Nedunchezhiyan (Thailand) Perakiat Siriluethaiwattana (India) Ajai Selvaraj (India) Arjun Kadhe
July 30	Italy F20 Futures; La Spezia, Italy; Clay $15,000+H	(Austria) Michael Linzer; 0–6, 6–4, 6–2	(Brazil) Leonardo Kirche	(Serbia) Nikola Ćirić (Spain) Guillermo Olaso	(Netherlands) Miliaan Niesten (Portugal) Pedro Sousa (Spain) Gerard Granollers Pujol (Brazil) Guilherme Clezar
July 30	Italy F20 Futures; La Spezia, Italy; Clay $15,000+H	(Colombia) Cristian Rodríguez (Colombia) Óscar Rodríguez; 7–6^{(7–1)}, 6–4	(Colombia) Alejandro González (Portugal) Pedro Sousa	(Serbia) Nikola Ćirić (Spain) Guillermo Olaso	(Netherlands) Miliaan Niesten (Portugal) Pedro Sousa (Spain) Gerard Granollers Pujol (Brazil) Guilherme Clezar
July 30	Lithuania F1 Futures; Vilnius, Lithuania; Clay $10,000	(Chile) Hans Podlipnik Castillo; 6–1, 6–1	(Switzerland) Joss Espasandin	(Russia) Ivan Nedelko (Italy) Viktor Galović	(France) Laurent Malouli (Russia) Konstantin Gerlakh (France) Laurent Recouderc (Latvia) Miķelis Lībietis
July 30	Lithuania F1 Futures; Vilnius, Lithuania; Clay $10,000	(Greece) Theodoros Angelinos (Netherlands) Mark Vervoort; Walkover	(Estonia) Vladimir Ivanov (Russia) Ivan Nedelko	(Russia) Ivan Nedelko (Italy) Viktor Galović	(France) Laurent Malouli (Russia) Konstantin Gerlakh (France) Laurent Recouderc (Latvia) Miķelis Lībietis
July 30	Russia F10 Futures; Moscow, Russia; Clay $15,000	(Netherlands) Boy Westerhof; 7–5, 6–1	(Russia) Anton Zaitcev	(France) Florian Reynet (Georgia (country)) Nikoloz Basilashvili	(Russia) Mikhail Fufygin (Belarus) Siarhei Betau (Russia) Mikhail Biryukov (Latvia) Deniss Pavlovs
July 30	Russia F10 Futures; Moscow, Russia; Clay $15,000	(Ukraine) Volodymyr Uzhylovskyi (Belarus) Yahor Yatsyk; 6–2, 6–3	(Russia) Mikhail Fufygin (Russia) Andrei Levine	(France) Florian Reynet (Georgia (country)) Nikoloz Basilashvili	(Russia) Mikhail Fufygin (Belarus) Siarhei Betau (Russia) Mikhail Biryukov (Latvia) Deniss Pavlovs
July 30	Serbia F7 Futures; Sombor, Serbia; Clay $10,000	(Bosnia and Herzegovina) Aldin Šetkić; 6–2, 6–1	(Serbia) Ivan Bjelica	(Croatia) Mate Delić (Serbia) Nikola Ćaćić	(Hungary) Attila Balázs (Slovenia) Nik Razboršek (Serbia) Marko Djokovic (Croatia) Duje Kekez
July 30	Serbia F7 Futures; Sombor, Serbia; Clay $10,000	(Bosnia and Herzegovina) Ismar Gorčić (Bosnia and Herzegovina) Aldin Šetkić; 6–2, 7–6^{(7–1)}	(Serbia) Ivan Bjelica (Croatia) Matej Sabanov	(Croatia) Mate Delić (Serbia) Nikola Ćaćić	(Hungary) Attila Balázs (Slovenia) Nik Razboršek (Serbia) Marko Djokovic (Croatia) Duje Kekez
July 30	Slovakia F1 Futures; Piešťany, Slovakia; Clay $10,000	(Slovakia) Andrej Martin; 1–6, 7–6^{(7–5)}, 6–1	(Slovakia) Miloslav Mečíř	(Slovenia) Blaž Rola (Slovakia) Marek Semjan	(Austria) Pascal Brunner (Poland) Grzegorz Panfil (Slovakia) Filip Horanský (United Kingdom) Daniel Smethurst
July 30	Slovakia F1 Futures; Piešťany, Slovakia; Clay $10,000	(Chile) Pedro Graber-Anguita (Chile) Ricardo Urzúa-Rivera; 6–2, 6–2	(Slovakia) Adrian Partl (Czech Republic) Lukáš Vrňák	(Slovenia) Blaž Rola (Slovakia) Marek Semjan	(Austria) Pascal Brunner (Poland) Grzegorz Panfil (Slovakia) Filip Horanský (United Kingdom) Daniel Smethurst
July 30	Spain F22 Futures; Xàtiva, Spain; Clay $10,000	(Spain) Iván Navarro; 6–3, 6–3	(Japan) Taro Daniel	(Venezuela) David Souto (Spain) Marc Giner	(Spain) Juan-Samuel Arauzo-Martínez (Spain) Roberto Carballés Baena (Spain) Juan Lizariturry (Russia) Alexander Rumyantsev
July 30	Spain F22 Futures; Xàtiva, Spain; Clay $10,000	(Russia) Philipp Aleksanyan (Russia) Ivan Gakhov; 6–3, 1–6, [10–6]	(Spain) Marc García-Román (Spain) Oriol Roca Batalla	(Venezuela) David Souto (Spain) Marc Giner	(Spain) Juan-Samuel Arauzo-Martínez (Spain) Roberto Carballés Baena (Spain) Juan Lizariturry (Russia) Alexander Rumyantsev
July 30	Turkey F30 Futures; İzmir, Turkey; Clay $10,000	(Croatia) Marin Bradarić; 6–3, 6–4	(Italy) Alessandro Petrone	(Australia) Simon Ede (Egypt) Karim-Mohamed Maamoun	(France) Jérôme Inzerillo (Bulgaria) Alexandar Lazov (Croatia) Kristijan Mesaroš (Germany) Denis Gremelmayr
July 30	Turkey F30 Futures; İzmir, Turkey; Clay $10,000	(Ukraine) Vladyslav Manafov (Russia) Vitali Reshetnikov; 7–5, 6–1	(Sweden) Johan Bäckström (Sweden) Nima Madani	(Australia) Simon Ede (Egypt) Karim-Mohamed Maamoun	(France) Jérôme Inzerillo (Bulgaria) Alexandar Lazov (Croatia) Kristijan Mesaroš (Germany) Denis Gremelmayr
July 30	USA F22 Futures; Decatur, United States; Hard $10,000	(United States) Ryan Rowe; 6–4, 3–6, 6–4	(India) Sanam Singh	(Australia) Stephen Hoh (Zimbabwe) Takanyi Garanganga	(United States) Nick Chappell (Croatia) Ante Pavić (Russia) Artem Ilyushin (United States) Kevin King
July 30	USA F22 Futures; Decatur, United States; Hard $10,000	(United States) Peter Kobelt (United States) Connor Smith; 6–7^{(3–7)}, 7–6^{(10–8)}, [10–7]	(United States) Nick Chappell (United States) Dane Webb	(Australia) Stephen Hoh (Zimbabwe) Takanyi Garanganga	(United States) Nick Chappell (Croatia) Ante Pavić (Russia) Artem Ilyushin (United States) Kevin King

=== August ===
Week of	Tournament	Winner	Runners-up	Semifinalists	Quarterfinalists
August 6	Argentina F19 Futures; Mar del Plata, Argentina; Clay $10,000	(Argentina) Leandro Migani; 6–4, 6–4	(Argentina) Juan-Pablo Amado	(Argentina) Juan Vázquez-Valenzuela (Argentina) Mateo Nicolás Martínez	(Argentina) Andrés Molteni (Argentina) Gabriel Alejandro Hidalgo (Argentina) Mauricio Pérez Mota (Argentina) Juan Ignacio Londero
August 6	Argentina F19 Futures; Mar del Plata, Argentina; Clay $10,000	(Argentina) Leandro Migani (Argentina) Joaquín-Jesús Monteferrario; 6–1, 6–3	(Argentina) Gabriel Alejandro Hidalgo (Argentina) Mauricio Pérez Mota	(Argentina) Juan Vázquez-Valenzuela (Argentina) Mateo Nicolás Martínez	(Argentina) Andrés Molteni (Argentina) Gabriel Alejandro Hidalgo (Argentina) Mauricio Pérez Mota (Argentina) Juan Ignacio Londero
August 6	Austria F5 Futures; Wels, Austria; Clay $10,000	(Czech Republic) Jiří Veselý; 6–2, 6–2	(Austria) Marc Rath	(Czech Republic) Dušan Lojda (Czech Republic) Michal Franěk	(Austria) Gibril Diarra (Austria) Dennis Novak (Germany) Peter Heller (Russia) Mikhail Vasiliev
August 6	Austria F5 Futures; Wels, Austria; Clay $10,000	(Austria) Lukas Koncilia (Austria) Sebastian Stiefelmeyer; 6–4, 6–3	(Australia) Ryan Agar (Austria) Sebastian Bader	(Czech Republic) Dušan Lojda (Czech Republic) Michal Franěk	(Austria) Gibril Diarra (Austria) Dennis Novak (Germany) Peter Heller (Russia) Mikhail Vasiliev
August 6	Belgium F7 Futures; Eupen, Belgium; Clay $10,000	(France) Jonathan Eysseric; 6–4, 6–3	(Belgium) Julien Cagnina	(France) Martin Vaïsse (France) Olivier Patience	(Belgium) Kimmer Coppejans (France) Teri Groll (Belgium) Alexandre Folie (Belgium) Germain Gigounon
August 6	Belgium F7 Futures; Eupen, Belgium; Clay $10,000	(France) Teri Groll (France) Hugo Nys; 6–4, 6–3	(Belgium) Germain Gigounon (Belgium) James Junior Storme	(France) Martin Vaïsse (France) Olivier Patience	(Belgium) Kimmer Coppejans (France) Teri Groll (Belgium) Alexandre Folie (Belgium) Germain Gigounon
August 6	Brazil F20 Futures; Lorena, Brazil; Clay $10,000	(Brazil) José Pereira; 6–3, 6–7^{(4–7)}, 6–3	(Brazil) Nicolas Santos	(Brazil) André Miele (Brazil) Thales Turini	(Brazil) Fabrício Neis (Brazil) Charles Costa (Brazil) João Pedro Sorgi (Brazil) Tiago Lopes
August 6	Brazil F20 Futures; Lorena, Brazil; Clay $10,000	(Brazil) José Pereira (Brazil) João Pedro Sorgi; 3–6, 6–4, [10–8]	(Brazil) Caio Silva (Brazil) Thales Turini	(Brazil) André Miele (Brazil) Thales Turini	(Brazil) Fabrício Neis (Brazil) Charles Costa (Brazil) João Pedro Sorgi (Brazil) Tiago Lopes
August 6	Finland F1 Futures; Vierumäki, Finland; Clay $10,000	(Estonia) Vladimir Ivanov; 6–4, 6–2	(Sweden) Milos Sekulic	(Finland) Timo Nieminen (Spain) Andrés Artuñedo	(Finland) Max Wennakoski (Spain) Juan Lizariturry (Finland) Juho Paukku (Finland) Henrik Sillanpää
August 6	Finland F1 Futures; Vierumäki, Finland; Clay $10,000	(Finland) Sami Huurinainen (Finland) Jesper Saarni; 7–6^{(7–4)}, 7–5	(Spain) Andrés Artuñedo (Spain) Juan Lizariturry	(Finland) Timo Nieminen (Spain) Andrés Artuñedo	(Finland) Max Wennakoski (Spain) Juan Lizariturry (Finland) Juho Paukku (Finland) Henrik Sillanpää
August 6	Germany F13 Futures; Friedberg, Germany; Clay $10,000	(Germany) Steven Moneke; 6–2, 6–2	(Australia) Dane Propoggia	(Germany) Ralph Regus (Austria) Bastian Trinker	(Germany) Marc Meigel (Germany) Richard Waite (Spain) Enrique López Pérez (New Zealand) José Statham
August 6	Germany F13 Futures; Friedberg, Germany; Clay $10,000	(Australia) Dane Propoggia (New Zealand) José Statham; 6–1, 6–4	(Mexico) Miguel Ángel Reyes-Varela (Mexico) Bruno Rodríguez	(Germany) Ralph Regus (Austria) Bastian Trinker	(Germany) Marc Meigel (Germany) Richard Waite (Spain) Enrique López Pérez (New Zealand) José Statham
August 6	Great Britain F13 Futures; Cumberland, United Kingdom; Hard $15,000	(United Kingdom) Daniel Evans; 6–2, 7–5	(United Kingdom) Daniel Cox	(United Kingdom) Neil Pauffley (United Kingdom) Joshua Milton	(France) Alexandre Sidorenko (United Kingdom) Tom Burn (United Kingdom) Kyle Edmund (United Kingdom) Richard Bloomfield
August 6	Great Britain F13 Futures; Cumberland, United Kingdom; Hard $15,000	(United Kingdom) Andrew Fitzpatrick (United Kingdom) Sean Thornley; 7–6^{(7–2)}, 6–2	(United Kingdom) Tom Burn (United Kingdom) Daniel Evans	(United Kingdom) Neil Pauffley (United Kingdom) Joshua Milton	(France) Alexandre Sidorenko (United Kingdom) Tom Burn (United Kingdom) Kyle Edmund (United Kingdom) Richard Bloomfield
August 6	Latvia F1 Futures; Jūrmala, Latvia; Clay $10,000	(Belgium) Arthur De Greef; 6–3, 1–0 Ret.	(Latvia) Andis Juška	(Italy) Roberto Marcora (Germany) Jonas Lütjen	(Latvia) Deniss Pavlovs (Belarus) Andrei Vasilevski (France) François-Arthur Vibert (Poland) Mikołaj Jędruszczak
August 6	Latvia F1 Futures; Jūrmala, Latvia; Clay $10,000	(Italy) Giammarco Micolani (Italy) Giorgio Portaluri; 0–6, 7–6^{(7–5)}, [10–5]	(Latvia) Miķelis Lībietis (Latvia) Oskars Vaskis	(Italy) Roberto Marcora (Germany) Jonas Lütjen	(Latvia) Deniss Pavlovs (Belarus) Andrei Vasilevski (France) François-Arthur Vibert (Poland) Mikołaj Jędruszczak
August 6	Russia F11 Futures; Moscow, Russia; Clay $15,000	(Netherlands) Boy Westerhof; 6–4, 6–4	(Russia) Nikoloz Basilashvili	(Russia) Ivan Nedelko (Russia) Andrey Kumantsov	(Russia) Aleksandr Lobkov (Russia) Mikhail Biryukov (Italy) Edoardo Eremin (Russia) Mikhail Fufygin
August 6	Russia F11 Futures; Moscow, Russia; Clay $15,000	(Russia) Mikhail Fufygin (Russia) Andrei Levine; 7–6^{(11–9)}, 7–6^{(7–3)}	(Russia) Andrey Kumantsov (Russia) Alexander Pavlioutchenkov	(Russia) Ivan Nedelko (Russia) Andrey Kumantsov	(Russia) Aleksandr Lobkov (Russia) Mikhail Biryukov (Italy) Edoardo Eremin (Russia) Mikhail Fufygin
August 6	Serbia F8 Futures; Novi Sad, Serbia; Clay $10,000	(Serbia) Ivan Bjelica; 2–6, 7–5, 6–2	(Croatia) Dino Marcan	(Serbia) Nikola Ćaćić (Bosnia and Herzegovina) Aldin Šetkić	(Serbia) Danilo Petrović (Serbia) Vladimir Obradović (Serbia) Luka Ilić (Serbia) Marko Djokovic
August 6	Serbia F8 Futures; Novi Sad, Serbia; Clay $10,000	(Netherlands) Romano Frantzen (Netherlands) Wesley Koolhof; 3–6, 7–5, [11–9]	(Croatia) Mate Cutura (Croatia) Antun Pehar	(Serbia) Nikola Ćaćić (Bosnia and Herzegovina) Aldin Šetkić	(Serbia) Danilo Petrović (Serbia) Vladimir Obradović (Serbia) Luka Ilić (Serbia) Marko Djokovic
August 6	Slovakia F2 Futures; Tatranská Lomnica/Poprad, Slovakia; Clay $10,000	(Slovakia) Ján Stančík; 6–2, 6–4	(Czech Republic) Jan Blecha	(Slovakia) Marek Semjan (Czech Republic) Jan Šátral	(Slovakia) Juraj Masár (Slovakia) Miloslav Mečíř Jr. (Czech Republic) Daniel Lustig (Slovakia) Jozef Kovalík
August 6	Slovakia F2 Futures; Tatranská Lomnica/Poprad, Slovakia; Clay $10,000	(Czech Republic) Jan Blecha (Czech Republic) Daniel Lustig; 6–1, 7–6^{(7–5)}	(Slovakia) Filip Horanský (Slovakia) Filip Vittek	(Slovakia) Marek Semjan (Czech Republic) Jan Šátral	(Slovakia) Juraj Masár (Slovakia) Miloslav Mečíř Jr. (Czech Republic) Daniel Lustig (Slovakia) Jozef Kovalík
August 6	Turkey F31 Futures; İzmir, Turkey; Clay $10,000	(Italy) Alberto Brizzi; 6–2, 6–1	(Italy) Claudio Fortuna	(Croatia) Marin Bradarić (Croatia) Kristijan Mesaroš	(Egypt) Karim-Mohamed Maamoun (Italy) Alessandro Petrone (Greece) Alexandros Jakupovic (Bulgaria) Alexandar Lazov
August 6	Turkey F31 Futures; İzmir, Turkey; Clay $10,000	(Italy) Alessandro Bega (Italy) Riccardo Sinicropi; 6–4, 7–5	(Ukraine) Vladyslav Manafov (Russia) Vitali Reshetnikov	(Croatia) Marin Bradarić (Croatia) Kristijan Mesaroš	(Egypt) Karim-Mohamed Maamoun (Italy) Alessandro Petrone (Greece) Alexandros Jakupovic (Bulgaria) Alexandar Lazov
August 6	USA F23 Futures; Edwardsville, United States; Hard $10,000	(Croatia) Ante Pavić; 7–6^{(7–3)}, 7–5	(United States) Eric Quigley	(Australia) Mark Verryth (United States) Jason Jung	(Zimbabwe) Takanyi Garanganga (United States) Daniel Nguyen (Egypt) Karim Hossam (United States) Evan King
August 6	USA F23 Futures; Edwardsville, United States; Hard $10,000	(United States) Daniel Nguyen (United States) Ryan Rowe; 6–3, 7–5	(South Korea) Chung Hyeon (South Korea) Nam Ji-sung	(Australia) Mark Verryth (United States) Jason Jung	(Zimbabwe) Takanyi Garanganga (United States) Daniel Nguyen (Egypt) Karim Hossam (United States) Evan King
August 13	Argentina F20 Futures; Buenos Aires, Argentina; Clay $10,000	(Argentina) Diego Schwartzman; 7–6^{(7–1)}, 6–3	(United States) Andrea Collarini	(Argentina) Leandro Migani (Argentina) Andrés Molteni	(Argentina) Juan-Pablo Amado (Italy) Federico Gaio (Argentina) Juan Ignacio Londero (Argentina) Guillermo Durán
August 13	Argentina F20 Futures; Buenos Aires, Argentina; Clay $10,000	The event was cancelled due to bad weather.		(Argentina) Leandro Migani (Argentina) Andrés Molteni	(Argentina) Juan-Pablo Amado (Italy) Federico Gaio (Argentina) Juan Ignacio Londero (Argentina) Guillermo Durán
August 13	Austria F6 Futures; Innsbruck, Austria; Clay $10,000	(Austria) Patrick Ofner; 3–6, 6–4, 6–4	(Germany) Robin Kern	(Italy) Giacomo Oradini (Italy) Matteo Marrai	(Austria) Tristan-Samuel Weissborn (Austria) Marc Rath (Austria) Nicolas Reissig (Croatia) Mate Pavić
August 13	Austria F6 Futures; Innsbruck, Austria; Clay $10,000	(Austria) Maximilian Neuchrist (Croatia) Mate Pavić; 6–4, 6–3	(Austria) Lukas Jastraunig (Austria) Tristan-Samuel Weissborn	(Italy) Giacomo Oradini (Italy) Matteo Marrai	(Austria) Tristan-Samuel Weissborn (Austria) Marc Rath (Austria) Nicolas Reissig (Croatia) Mate Pavić
August 13	Belgium F8 Futures; Koksijde, Belgium; Clay $10,000	(Belgium) Niels Desein; 6–2, 6–0	(Ecuador) Juan Sebastián Vivanco	(Belgium) Joris De Loore (Belgium) Jeroen Vanneste	(Republic of Ireland) Sam Barry (United Kingdom) Oliver Golding (France) Maxime Tabatruong (France) Michael Bois
August 13	Belgium F8 Futures; Koksijde, Belgium; Clay $10,000	(Republic of Ireland) Daniel Glancy (Mexico) Manuel Sánchez; 3–6, 6–2, [10–8]	(Belgium) Joris De Loore (United Kingdom) Oliver Golding	(Belgium) Joris De Loore (Belgium) Jeroen Vanneste	(Republic of Ireland) Sam Barry (United Kingdom) Oliver Golding (France) Maxime Tabatruong (France) Michael Bois
August 13	Brazil F21 Futures; São José do Rio Preto, Brazil; Clay $15,000	(Brazil) Nicolas Santos; 6–2, 6–2	(Brazil) Thiago Monteiro	(Brazil) Bruno Sant'Anna (Brazil) José Pereira	(Brazil) Thales Turini (Brazil) Marcelo Zormann (Brazil) Fabiano de Paula (Brazil) Gabriel Friedrich
August 13	Brazil F21 Futures; São José do Rio Preto, Brazil; Clay $15,000	(Argentina) Maximiliano Estévez (Brazil) José Pereira; 6–2, 6–1	(Brazil) Fabiano de Paula (Brazil) Bruno Sant'Anna	(Brazil) Bruno Sant'Anna (Brazil) José Pereira	(Brazil) Thales Turini (Brazil) Marcelo Zormann (Brazil) Fabiano de Paula (Brazil) Gabriel Friedrich
August 13	Canada F5 Futures; Mississauga, Canada; Hard $15,000	(Thailand) Danai Udomchoke; 7–5, 7–6^{(7–5)}	(Canada) Peter Polansky	(Brazil) Fernando Romboli (United States) Dennis Lajola	(Mexico) Daniel Garza (Croatia) Ante Pavić (Finland) Harri Heliövaara (United States) Reid Carleton
August 13	Canada F5 Futures; Mississauga, Canada; Hard $15,000	(United States) Jason Jung (United States) Evan King; 6–4, 6–2	(Canada) Kamil Pajkowski (Canada) Milan Pokrajac	(Brazil) Fernando Romboli (United States) Dennis Lajola	(Mexico) Daniel Garza (Croatia) Ante Pavić (Finland) Harri Heliövaara (United States) Reid Carleton
August 13	Colombia F1 Futures; Bogotá, Colombia; Clay $15,000	(Dominican Republic) Víctor Estrella; 7–5, 6–4	(Colombia) Nicolás Barrientos	(Peru) Duilio Beretta (Peru) Mauricio Echazú	(Colombia) Michael Quintero (Colombia) Juan Sebastián Gómez (Mexico) César Ramírez (United States) Greg Ouellette
August 13	Colombia F1 Futures; Bogotá, Colombia; Clay $15,000	(Peru) Mauricio Echazú (Mexico) César Ramírez; 6–4, 7–5	(Dominican Republic) Víctor Estrella (Colombia) Michael Quintero	(Peru) Duilio Beretta (Peru) Mauricio Echazú	(Colombia) Michael Quintero (Colombia) Juan Sebastián Gómez (Mexico) César Ramírez (United States) Greg Ouellette
August 13	Croatia F7 Futures; Čakovec, Croatia; Clay $10,000	(Germany) Peter Heller; 6–4, 6–0	(Slovenia) Blaž Rola	(Croatia) Joško Topić (Croatia) Toni Androić	(Slovenia) Nik Razboršek (Slovenia) Andraž Bedene (Croatia) Luka Zaninović (Slovenia) Tomislav Ternar
August 13	Croatia F7 Futures; Čakovec, Croatia; Clay $10,000	(France) Thibault Venturino (Slovenia) Janoš Žibrat; 6–3, 6–4	(Slovenia) Blaž Rola (Slovenia) Tomislav Ternar	(Croatia) Joško Topić (Croatia) Toni Androić	(Slovenia) Nik Razboršek (Slovenia) Andraž Bedene (Croatia) Luka Zaninović (Slovenia) Tomislav Ternar
August 13	Ecuador F1 Futures; Guayaquil, Ecuador; Hard $10,000	(Ecuador) Emilio Gómez; 6–3, 4–6, 6–2	(Dominican Republic) José Hernández	(Ecuador) Julio César Campozano (Puerto Rico) Alex Llompart	(Ecuador) Roberto Quiroz (Venezuela) Luis David Martínez (Ecuador) Iván Endara (Peru) Sergio Galdós
August 13	Ecuador F1 Futures; Guayaquil, Ecuador; Hard $10,000	(Ecuador) Emilio Gómez (Ecuador) Roberto Quiroz; 6–4, 7–6^{(7–4)}	(Mexico) Miguel Gallardo Valles (Venezuela) Luis David Martínez	(Ecuador) Julio César Campozano (Puerto Rico) Alex Llompart	(Ecuador) Roberto Quiroz (Venezuela) Luis David Martínez (Ecuador) Iván Endara (Peru) Sergio Galdós
August 13	Finland F2 Futures; Kotka, Finland; Clay $10,000	(Spain) Juan Lizariturry; 6–1, 7–6^{(7–5)}	(Estonia) Vladimir Ivanov	(Sweden) Michael Ryderstedt (Finland) Timo Nieminen	(France) Constantin Belot (Finland) Juho Paukku (Sweden) Markus Eriksson (France) Alexandre Penaud
August 13	Finland F2 Futures; Kotka, Finland; Clay $10,000	(Finland) Sami Huurinainen (Finland) Jesper Saarni; 6–4, 6–7^{(4–7)}, [10–4]	(Finland) Herkko Pöllänen (Finland) Max Wennakoski	(Sweden) Michael Ryderstedt (Finland) Timo Nieminen	(France) Constantin Belot (Finland) Juho Paukku (Sweden) Markus Eriksson (France) Alexandre Penaud
August 13	Germany F14 Futures; Karlsruhe, Germany; Clay $10,000	(Germany) Bastian Knittel; 3–6, 6–1, 7–6^{(9–7)}	(Germany) Jeremy Jahn	(Australia) Dane Propoggia (Germany) Marko Lenz	(Germany) Marvin Netuschil (Germany) Matthias Wunner (New Zealand) José Statham (France) François-Arthur Vibert
August 13	Germany F14 Futures; Karlsruhe, Germany; Clay $10,000	(Germany) Bastian Knittel (France) Albano Olivetti; 6–4, 6–4	(Italy) Giorgio Portaluri (France) François-Arthur Vibert	(Australia) Dane Propoggia (Germany) Marko Lenz	(Germany) Marvin Netuschil (Germany) Matthias Wunner (New Zealand) José Statham (France) François-Arthur Vibert
August 13	Italy F22 Futures; Appiano, Italy; Clay	(Italy) Simone Vagnozzi; 6–4, 7–6^{(7–5)}	(Chile) Jorge Aguilar	(Serbia) Nikola Ćirić (Germany) Jan-Lennard Struff	(Japan) Taro Daniel (Bosnia and Herzegovina) Mirza Bašić (Germany) Alex Satschko (Argentina) Sebastián Decoud
August 13	Italy F22 Futures; Appiano, Italy; Clay	(Bosnia and Herzegovina) Mirza Bašić (Serbia) Nikola Ćirić; 6–3, 6–7^{(5–7)}, [10–6]	(Italy) Andrea Arnaboldi (Italy) Alessandro Motti	(Serbia) Nikola Ćirić (Germany) Jan-Lennard Struff	(Japan) Taro Daniel (Bosnia and Herzegovina) Mirza Bašić (Germany) Alex Satschko (Argentina) Sebastián Decoud
August 13	Poland F4 Futures; Bydgoszcz, Poland; Clay $15,000	(Czech Republic) Dušan Lojda; 6–2, 3–6, 7–5	(Poland) Michał Przysiężny	(Czech Republic) Jiří Veselý (Belgium) Arthur De Greef	(Poland) Grzegorz Panfil (Poland) Adam Chadaj (Poland) Marcin Gawron (Belgium) Yannik Reuter
August 13	Poland F4 Futures; Bydgoszcz, Poland; Clay $15,000	(Ukraine) Artem Smirnov (Belarus) Andrei Vasilevski; 7–6^{(8–6)}, 6–0	(Poland) Grzegorz Panfil (Poland) Michał Przysiężny	(Czech Republic) Jiří Veselý (Belgium) Arthur De Greef	(Poland) Grzegorz Panfil (Poland) Adam Chadaj (Poland) Marcin Gawron (Belgium) Yannik Reuter
August 13	Romania F7 Futures; Iași, Romania; Clay $15,000	(Serbia) Boris Pašanski; 6–7^{(6–8)}, 6–3, 7–5	(Romania) Victor Crivoi	(Montenegro) Goran Tošić (Spain) Gerard Granollers Pujol	(United States) Denis Zivkovic (Romania) Răzvan Sabău (Romania) Petru-Alexandru Luncanu (Moldova) Andrei Ciumac
August 13	Romania F7 Futures; Iași, Romania; Clay $15,000	(Romania) Alexandru-Daniel Carpen (Chile) Cristóbal Saavedra Corvalán; 4–6, 7–6^{(8–6)}, [10–8]	(Montenegro) Goran Tošić (United States) Denis Zivkovic	(Montenegro) Goran Tošić (Spain) Gerard Granollers Pujol	(United States) Denis Zivkovic (Romania) Răzvan Sabău (Romania) Petru-Alexandru Luncanu (Moldova) Andrei Ciumac
August 13	Russia F12 Futures; Moscow, Russia; Clay $15,000	(Georgia (country)) Nikoloz Basilashvili; 6–3, 7–6^{(7–0)}	(Russia) Aleksandr Lobkov	(Russia) Evgeny Kirillov (Russia) Andrey Kumantsov	(Belarus) Yaraslav Shyla (Russia) Aslan Karatsev (Russia) Anton Zaitcev (Russia) Mikhail Fufygin
August 13	Russia F12 Futures; Moscow, Russia; Clay $15,000	(Russia) Mikhail Fufygin (Russia) Vitali Reshetnikov; 7–6^{(7–1)}, 6–2	(Belarus) Siarhei Betau (Russia) Mikhail Biryukov	(Russia) Evgeny Kirillov (Russia) Andrey Kumantsov	(Belarus) Yaraslav Shyla (Russia) Aslan Karatsev (Russia) Anton Zaitcev (Russia) Mikhail Fufygin
August 13	Serbia F9 Futures; Novi Sad, Serbia; Clay $10,000	(Spain) Carlos Gómez-Herrera; 6–2, 6–2	(Serbia) Miljan Zekić	(Italy) Roberto Marcora (Serbia) Ivan Bjelica	(Croatia) Dino Marcan (Serbia) Nikola Ćaćić (Serbia) Marko Djokovic (United Kingdom) Matthew Short
August 13	Serbia F9 Futures; Novi Sad, Serbia; Clay $10,000	(Serbia) Marko Djokovic (Spain) Carlos Gómez-Herrera; 6–4, 6–3	(Croatia) Mate Cutura (Bosnia and Herzegovina) Franjo Raspudić	(Italy) Roberto Marcora (Serbia) Ivan Bjelica	(Croatia) Dino Marcan (Serbia) Nikola Ćaćić (Serbia) Marko Djokovic (United Kingdom) Matthew Short
August 13	Slovakia F3 Futures; Tatranská Lomnica/Poprad, Slovakia; Clay $10,000	(Czech Republic) Jaroslav Pospíšil; 6–4, 7–5	(Hungary) Márton Fucsovics	(Slovakia) Marek Semjan (Czech Republic) Daniel Lustig	(Slovakia) Juraj Masár (Czech Republic) Jan Šátral (Slovakia) Miloslav Mečíř (Czech Republic) Roman Jebavý
August 13	Slovakia F3 Futures; Tatranská Lomnica/Poprad, Slovakia; Clay $10,000	(Czech Republic) Roman Jebavý (Czech Republic) Jan Šátral; 6–2, 7–6^{(7–2)}	(Slovakia) Filip Havaj (Slovakia) Juraj Šimčák	(Slovakia) Marek Semjan (Czech Republic) Daniel Lustig	(Slovakia) Juraj Masár (Czech Republic) Jan Šátral (Slovakia) Miloslav Mečíř (Czech Republic) Roman Jebavý
August 13	Spain F24 Futures; Vigo, Spain; Clay $10,000	(Spain) José Checa Calvo; 6–4, 3–6, 6–2	(Venezuela) Ricardo Rodríguez	(Kazakhstan) Denis Yevseyev (Russia) Alexander Rumyantsev	(Spain) David Pérez Sanz (Spain) Pol Toledo Bagué (Spain) Oriol Roca Batalla (Germany) Jean-Marc Werner
August 13	Spain F24 Futures; Vigo, Spain; Clay $10,000	(Spain) Miguel Ángel López Jaén (Spain) Andoni Vivanco-Guzmán; 6–2, 7–6^{(7–2)}	(Russia) Alexander Rumyantsev (Kazakhstan) Denis Yevseyev	(Kazakhstan) Denis Yevseyev (Russia) Alexander Rumyantsev	(Spain) David Pérez Sanz (Spain) Pol Toledo Bagué (Spain) Oriol Roca Batalla (Germany) Jean-Marc Werner
August 13	Turkey F32 Futures; İzmir, Turkey; Clay $10,000	(Italy) Alberto Brizzi; 7–6^{(7–3)}, 6–1	(Bulgaria) Dimitar Kuzmanov	(Greece) Alexandros Jakupovic (Italy) Riccardo Sinicropi	(France) Romain Sichez (Italy) Alessandro Bega (Australia) Simon Ede (Italy) Andrea Basso
August 13	Turkey F32 Futures; İzmir, Turkey; Clay $10,000	(Greece) Alexandros Jakupovic (Ukraine) Vladyslav Manafov; 6–4, 6–7^{(4–7)}, [12–10]	(Italy) Alessandro Bega (Italy) Riccardo Sinicropi	(Greece) Alexandros Jakupovic (Italy) Riccardo Sinicropi	(France) Romain Sichez (Italy) Alessandro Bega (Australia) Simon Ede (Italy) Andrea Basso
August 20	Argentina F21 Futures; Rosario, Argentina; Clay $10,000	(Argentina) Diego Schwartzman; 6–2, 7–5	(Argentina) Pablo Galdón	(Argentina) Leandro Migani (Argentina) Mauricio Pérez Mota	(Argentina) Guillermo Durán (Argentina) Federico Coria (Argentina) Mateo Nicolás Martínez (Argentina) Juan-Pablo Amado
August 20	Argentina F21 Futures; Rosario, Argentina; Clay $10,000	(Bolivia) Hugo Dellien (Japan) Ryusei Makiguchi; 6–4, 1–6, [10–7]	(Argentina) Guillermo Bujniewicz (Argentina) Fabricio Burdisso	(Argentina) Leandro Migani (Argentina) Mauricio Pérez Mota	(Argentina) Guillermo Durán (Argentina) Federico Coria (Argentina) Mateo Nicolás Martínez (Argentina) Juan-Pablo Amado
August 20	Austria F7 Futures; Pörtschach, Austria; Clay $10,000	(Italy) Riccardo Bellotti; 6–1, 6–4	(Czech Republic) Jaroslav Pospíšil	(Austria) Gerald Melzer (Austria) Pascal Brunner	(Montenegro) Ljubomir Čelebić (Italy) Matteo Marrai (Slovenia) Tomislav Ternar (Austria) Dennis Novak
August 20	Austria F7 Futures; Pörtschach, Austria; Clay $10,000	(Austria) Lukas Jastraunig (Austria) Tristan-Samuel Weissborn; 7–6^{(7–5)}, 6–3	(Austria) Maximilian Neuchrist (Croatia) Mate Pavić	(Austria) Gerald Melzer (Austria) Pascal Brunner	(Montenegro) Ljubomir Čelebić (Italy) Matteo Marrai (Slovenia) Tomislav Ternar (Austria) Dennis Novak
August 20	Belgium F9 Futures; Huy, Belgium; Clay $10,000	(Belgium) Alexandre Folie; 7–6^{(7–4)}, 6–4	(Belgium) Germain Gigounon	(Belgium) Jeroen Vanneste (Belgium) Joris De Loore	(France) Victor Girat Magin (Croatia) Kristijan Mesaroš (Czech Republic) Jakub Lustyk (France) Florian Reynet
August 20	Belgium F9 Futures; Huy, Belgium; Clay $10,000	(Belgium) Clément Geens (Belgium) Arnaud Graisse; 6–2, 6–4	(Belgium) Antoine Champagne (Belgium) Kevin Farin	(Belgium) Jeroen Vanneste (Belgium) Joris De Loore	(France) Victor Girat Magin (Croatia) Kristijan Mesaroš (Czech Republic) Jakub Lustyk (France) Florian Reynet
August 20	Brazil F22 Futures; São Paulo, Brazil; Clay $10,000	(Brazil) Bruno Sant'Anna; 3–6, 7–5, 6–1	(Brazil) Tiago Lopes	(Chile) Nicolás Gustavo Kauer (Brazil) Ricardo Hocevar	(Argentina) Maximiliano Estévez (Brazil) Fabiano de Paula (Brazil) Alexandre Schnitman (Brazil) André Miele
August 20	Brazil F22 Futures; São Paulo, Brazil; Clay $10,000	(Brazil) Fabiano de Paula (Brazil) João Pedro Sorgi; 6–2, 6–4	(Brazil) Rodrigo-Antonio Grilli (Brazil) André Miele	(Chile) Nicolás Gustavo Kauer (Brazil) Ricardo Hocevar	(Argentina) Maximiliano Estévez (Brazil) Fabiano de Paula (Brazil) Alexandre Schnitman (Brazil) André Miele
August 20	Canada F6 Futures; Winnipeg, Canada; Hard $15,000	(United States) Reid Carleton; 2–6, 6–3, 6–3	(Croatia) Ante Pavić	(United States) Alexander Sarkissian (Canada) Filip Peliwo	(Mexico) Daniel Garza (Italy) Matteo Donati (United States) Joshua Zavala (United States) Sekou Bangoura
August 20	Canada F6 Futures; Winnipeg, Canada; Hard $15,000	(Japan) Yuichi Ito (Croatia) Ante Pavić; 3–6 6–3 [20–18]	(Canada) Filip Peliwo (Canada) Milan Pokrajac	(United States) Alexander Sarkissian (Canada) Filip Peliwo	(Mexico) Daniel Garza (Italy) Matteo Donati (United States) Joshua Zavala (United States) Sekou Bangoura
August 20	Colombia F2 Futures; Medellín, Colombia; Clay $15,000	(Mexico) César Ramírez; Walkover	(Colombia) Michael Quintero	(Colombia) Nicolás Barrientos (Chile) Guillermo Rivera Aránguiz	(Peru) Duilio Beretta (United States) Christopher Racz (United States) Greg Ouellette (Colombia) Juan Sebastián Gómez
August 20	Colombia F2 Futures; Medellín, Colombia; Clay $15,000	(Uruguay) Ariel Behar (Peru) Duilio Beretta; 2–1 Ret.	(Colombia) Nicolás Barrientos (Colombia) Michael Quintero	(Colombia) Nicolás Barrientos (Chile) Guillermo Rivera Aránguiz	(Peru) Duilio Beretta (United States) Christopher Racz (United States) Greg Ouellette (Colombia) Juan Sebastián Gómez
August 20	Croatia F8 Futures; Vinkovci, Croatia; Clay $10,000	(Slovenia) Blaž Rola; 6–2, 6–2	(Croatia) Toni Androić	(Croatia) Mate Delić (Croatia) Mislav Hižak	(Bosnia and Herzegovina) Aldin Šetkić (Croatia) Joško Topić (Bosnia and Herzegovina) Tomislav Brkić (Croatia) Duje Kekez
August 20	Croatia F8 Futures; Vinkovci, Croatia; Clay $10,000	(Croatia) Mislav Hižak (Slovenia) Blaž Rola; 6–4, 7–6^{(7–3)}	(Bosnia and Herzegovina) Tomislav Brkić (Bosnia and Herzegovina) Aldin Šetkić	(Croatia) Mate Delić (Croatia) Mislav Hižak	(Bosnia and Herzegovina) Aldin Šetkić (Croatia) Joško Topić (Bosnia and Herzegovina) Tomislav Brkić (Croatia) Duje Kekez
August 20	Ecuador F2 Futures; Guayaquil, Ecuador; Hard $10,000	(Dominican Republic) José Hernández; 2–6, 6–3, 6–4	(Ecuador) Emilio Gómez	(Ecuador) Roberto Quiroz (Mexico) Miguel Gallardo Valles	(El Salvador) Marcelo Arévalo (New Zealand) Finn Tearney (Chile) Gonzalo Lama (Ecuador) Iván Endara
August 20	Ecuador F2 Futures; Guayaquil, Ecuador; Hard $10,000	(Ecuador) Emilio Gómez (Ecuador) Roberto Quiroz; 7–5, 6–2	(Peru) Sergio Galdós (Dominican Republic) José Hernández	(Ecuador) Roberto Quiroz (Mexico) Miguel Gallardo Valles	(El Salvador) Marcelo Arévalo (New Zealand) Finn Tearney (Chile) Gonzalo Lama (Ecuador) Iván Endara
August 20	Finland F3 Futures; Nastola, Finland; Clay $10,000	(Estonia) Vladimir Ivanov; 6–0, 4–6, 7–6^{(7–4)}	(Sweden) Markus Eriksson	(France) Alexandre Penaud (Russia) Aleksandr Vasilenko	(Finland) Timo Nieminen (Sweden) Robin Olin (Sweden) Milos Sekulic (Italy) Marco Speronello
August 20	Finland F3 Futures; Nastola, Finland; Clay $10,000	(Estonia) Vladimir Ivanov (France) Alexandre Penaud; 6–1, 6–1	(Finland) Mika Julin (Finland) Verneri Tuomi	(France) Alexandre Penaud (Russia) Aleksandr Vasilenko	(Finland) Timo Nieminen (Sweden) Robin Olin (Sweden) Milos Sekulic (Italy) Marco Speronello
August 20	Germany F15 Futures; Überlingen, Germany; Clay $10,000	(Germany) Bastian Knittel; 7–6^{(7–5)}, 6–1	(Switzerland) Sandro Ehrat	(France) Davy Sum (Germany) Peter Heller	(France) François-Arthur Vibert (Czech Republic) Jan Blecha (Germany) George von Massow (Austria) Bastian Trinker
August 20	Germany F15 Futures; Überlingen, Germany; Clay $10,000	(Philippines) Ruben Gonzales (Australia) Chris Letcher; 7–6^{(8–6)}, 6–4	(Switzerland) Sandro Ehrat (Germany) Florian Fallert	(France) Davy Sum (Germany) Peter Heller	(France) François-Arthur Vibert (Czech Republic) Jan Blecha (Germany) George von Massow (Austria) Bastian Trinker
August 20	Italy F23 Futures; Este, Italy; Clay $15,000+H	(Germany) Jan-Lennard Struff; 6–7^{(3–7)}, 6–2, 6–2	(Italy) Salvatore Caruso	(Italy) Marco Cecchinato (Bosnia and Herzegovina) Mirza Bašić	(Italy) Simone Vagnozzi (Colombia) Óscar Rodríguez (Chile) Jorge Aguilar (Italy) Daniele Giorgini
August 20	Italy F23 Futures; Este, Italy; Clay $15,000+H	(Germany) Alex Satschko (Germany) Jan-Lennard Struff; 4–6, 6–4, [10–7]	(Chile) Jorge Aguilar (Chile) Juan Carlos Sáez	(Italy) Marco Cecchinato (Bosnia and Herzegovina) Mirza Bašić	(Italy) Simone Vagnozzi (Colombia) Óscar Rodríguez (Chile) Jorge Aguilar (Italy) Daniele Giorgini
August 20	Netherlands F5 Futures; Enschede, Netherlands; Clay $10,000	(United Kingdom) Alexander Slabinsky; 6–7^{(5–7)}, 6–3, 6–4	(United Kingdom) Oliver Golding	(Germany) Lennart Zynga (Netherlands) Antal van der Duim	(France) Axel Michon (Czech Republic) Michal Schmid (Republic of Ireland) Sam Barry (Russia) Philip Davydenko
August 20	Netherlands F5 Futures; Enschede, Netherlands; Clay $10,000	(Netherlands Antilles) Alexander Blom (Netherlands) Kevin Griekspoor; 6–3, 7–6^{(10–8)}	(Republic of Ireland) Sam Barry (Republic of Ireland) Daniel Glancy	(Germany) Lennart Zynga (Netherlands) Antal van der Duim	(France) Axel Michon (Czech Republic) Michal Schmid (Republic of Ireland) Sam Barry (Russia) Philip Davydenko
August 20	Poland F5 Futures; Poznań, Poland; Clay $15,000	(Czech Republic) Dušan Lojda; 6–3, 2–6, 6–1	(Poland) Grzegorz Panfil	(Belgium) Yannik Reuter (Belgium) Arthur De Greef	(Germany) Marc Sieber (Spain) Roberto Carballés Baena (Poland) Marcin Gawron (Chile) Laslo Urrutia Fuentes
August 20	Poland F5 Futures; Poznań, Poland; Clay $15,000	(Poland) Marcin Gawron (Poland) Andriej Kapaś; 6–7^{(3–7)}, 6–2, [10–7]	(Poland) Tomasz Bednarek (Poland) Mateusz Kowalczyk	(Belgium) Yannik Reuter (Belgium) Arthur De Greef	(Germany) Marc Sieber (Spain) Roberto Carballés Baena (Poland) Marcin Gawron (Chile) Laslo Urrutia Fuentes
August 20	Romania F8 Futures; Mediaș, Romania; Clay $10,000	(Moldova) Maxim Dubarenco; 6–3, 7–5	(Romania) Andrei Mlendea	(Italy) Giulio Torroni (Romania) Patrick Ciorcila	(Chile) Cristóbal Saavedra Corvalán (Moldova) Andrei Ciumac (Romania) Teodor-Dacian Crăciun (Spain) Marc Giner
August 20	Romania F8 Futures; Mediaș, Romania; Clay $10,000	(Moldova) Andrei Ciumac (Moldova) Maxim Dubarenco; 7–6^{(7–5)}, 6–4	(Romania) Alexandru-Daniel Carpen (Chile) Cristóbal Saavedra Corvalán	(Italy) Giulio Torroni (Romania) Patrick Ciorcila	(Chile) Cristóbal Saavedra Corvalán (Moldova) Andrei Ciumac (Romania) Teodor-Dacian Crăciun (Spain) Marc Giner
August 20	Russia F13 Futures; Vsevolozhsk, Russia; Clsy $10,000	(Russia) Aleksandr Lobkov; 6–3, 6–3	(Russia) Andrey Kumantsov	(Russia) Ivan Nedelko (Kazakhstan) Yuri Schukin	(Belarus) Nikolai Fidirko (Sweden) Patrik Brydolf (Russia) Yan Sabanin (Russia) Mikhail Biryukov
August 20	Russia F13 Futures; Vsevolozhsk, Russia; Clsy $10,000	(Russia) Vitaliy Kachanovskiy (Russia) Richard Muzaev; 6–2, 6–3	(Russia) Aslan Karatsev (Russia) Vitali Reshetnikov	(Russia) Ivan Nedelko (Kazakhstan) Yuri Schukin	(Belarus) Nikolai Fidirko (Sweden) Patrik Brydolf (Russia) Yan Sabanin (Russia) Mikhail Biryukov
August 20	Serbia F10 Futures; Zlatibor, Serbia; Clay $10,000	(Serbia) Ivan Bjelica; 6–4, 3–6, 6–3	(Serbia) Danilo Petrović	(Serbia) Arsenije Zlatanović (Serbia) Saša Stojisavljević	(Serbia) Miki Janković (Serbia) Denis Bejtulahi (France) Nicolas Rosenzweig (Serbia) Nikola Ćaćić
August 20	Serbia F10 Futures; Zlatibor, Serbia; Clay $10,000	(Serbia) Danilo Petrović (Serbia) Miljan Zekić; 6–2, 4–6, [10–7]	(Serbia) Miki Janković (Serbia) Peđa Krstin	(Serbia) Arsenije Zlatanović (Serbia) Saša Stojisavljević	(Serbia) Miki Janković (Serbia) Denis Bejtulahi (France) Nicolas Rosenzweig (Serbia) Nikola Ćaćić
August 20	Spain F25 Futures; Ourense, Spain; Hard $10,000	(Spain) David Pérez Sanz; 6–4, 6–4	(Spain) Marc Fornell Mestres	(Italy) Erik Crepaldi (Spain) Miguel Ángel López Jaén	(Spain) José Checa Calvo (Kazakhstan) Denis Yevseyev (Russia) Alexander Rumyantsev (United Kingdom) Joshua Milton
August 20	Spain F25 Futures; Ourense, Spain; Hard $10,000	(Spain) Ricardo Ojeda Lara (Spain) Oriol Roca Batalla; 7–6^{(7–3)}, 7–6^{(9–7)}	(Italy) Erik Crepaldi (United Kingdom) James Marsalek	(Italy) Erik Crepaldi (Spain) Miguel Ángel López Jaén	(Spain) José Checa Calvo (Kazakhstan) Denis Yevseyev (Russia) Alexander Rumyantsev (United Kingdom) Joshua Milton
August 20	Turkey F33 Futures; Istanbul, Turkey; Hard $10,000	(France) Yannick Jankovits; 6–2, 6–7^{(2–7)}, 6–0	(France) Jules Marie	(United States) Sean Berman (Bulgaria) Dimitar Kuzmanov	(Italy) Riccardo Sinicropi (Italy) Damiano Di Ienno (France) Élie Rousset (Italy) Alessandro Bega
August 20	Turkey F33 Futures; Istanbul, Turkey; Hard $10,000	(France) Yannick Jankovits (France) Élie Rousset; 6–2, 6–3	(Turkey) Gökberk Ergeneman (Turkey) Anıl Yüksel	(United States) Sean Berman (Bulgaria) Dimitar Kuzmanov	(Italy) Riccardo Sinicropi (Italy) Damiano Di Ienno (France) Élie Rousset (Italy) Alessandro Bega
August 27	Argentina F22 Futures; Santiago del Estero, Argentina; Clay $10,000	(Argentina) Diego Schwartzman; 2–6, 7–5, 6–3	(Argentina) Leandro Migani	(Argentina) Marco Trungelliti (Argentina) Joaquín-Jesús Monteferrario	(Argentina) Andrés Molteni (Argentina) Gastón-Arturo Grimolizzi (Argentina) Mateo Nicolás Martínez (Argentina) Federico Clara Figueroa
August 27	Argentina F22 Futures; Santiago del Estero, Argentina; Clay $10,000	(Bolivia) Hugo Dellien (Argentina) Mateo Nicolás Martínez; 6–7^{(7–9)}, 6–1, [10–6]	(Argentina) Federico Coria (Argentina) Valentín Florez	(Argentina) Marco Trungelliti (Argentina) Joaquín-Jesús Monteferrario	(Argentina) Andrés Molteni (Argentina) Gastón-Arturo Grimolizzi (Argentina) Mateo Nicolás Martínez (Argentina) Federico Clara Figueroa
August 27	Australia F5 Futures; Cairns, Australia; Hard $15,000	(Australia) Luke Saville; 6–1, 7–6^{(7–3)}	(Australia) Michael Look	(Australia) Alex Bolt (Australia) Nick Lindahl	(New Zealand) Michael Venus (Australia) Andrew Whittington (Australia) Isaac Frost (Australia) Thanasi Kokkinakis
August 27	Australia F5 Futures; Cairns, Australia; Hard $15,000	(Australia) Adam Feeney (Australia) Nick Lindahl; 6–3, 7–5	(Australia) Jay Andrijic (Australia) Andrew Whittington	(Australia) Alex Bolt (Australia) Nick Lindahl	(New Zealand) Michael Venus (Australia) Andrew Whittington (Australia) Isaac Frost (Australia) Thanasi Kokkinakis
August 27	Austria F8 Futures; St. Pölten, Austria; Clay $10,000	(Italy) Riccardo Bellotti; 6–4, 6–3	(Slovakia) Miloslav Mečíř	(Czech Republic) Marek Michalička (Austria) Gibril Diarra	(Austria) Bastian Trinker (Austria) Mario Haider-Maurer (Austria) Tristan-Samuel Weissborn (Austria) Pascal Brunner
August 27	Austria F8 Futures; St. Pölten, Austria; Clay $10,000	(Austria) Lukas Jastraunig (Austria) Tristan-Samuel Weissborn; 6–2, 6–2	(Slovakia) Radoslav Novodomec (Slovakia) Michal Pažický	(Czech Republic) Marek Michalička (Austria) Gibril Diarra	(Austria) Bastian Trinker (Austria) Mario Haider-Maurer (Austria) Tristan-Samuel Weissborn (Austria) Pascal Brunner
August 27	Belgium F10 Futures; Damme, Belgium; Clay $10,000	(Belgium) Niels Desein; 3–6, 6–2, 7–6^{(7–4)}	(Belgium) Joris De Loore	(United Kingdom) Alexander Ward (France) Maxime Tabatruong	(France) Mathieu Rodrigues (Italy) Eros Siringo (Netherlands) Colin van Beem (Germany) Ivo Mijic
August 27	Belgium F10 Futures; Damme, Belgium; Clay $10,000	(Belgium) Niels Desein (Belgium) James Junior Storme; 3–6, 6–2, [10–3]	(Belgium) Yannis Baltogiannis (Belgium) Joris De Loore	(United Kingdom) Alexander Ward (France) Maxime Tabatruong	(France) Mathieu Rodrigues (Italy) Eros Siringo (Netherlands) Colin van Beem (Germany) Ivo Mijic
August 27	Brazil F23 Futures; Juiz de Fora, Brazil; Clay $10,000	(Brazil) Guilherme Clezar; 2–6, 7–6^{(7–4)}, 6–4	(Brazil) Fabiano de Paula	(Brazil) João Pedro Sorgi (Brazil) Tiago Lopes	(Brazil) Daniel Dutra da Silva (Brazil) André Miele (Brazil) Eduardo Piragine (Brazil) Fabrício Neis
August 27	Brazil F23 Futures; Juiz de Fora, Brazil; Clay $10,000	(Brazil) Fabiano de Paula (Brazil) Fabrício Neis; 6–2, 7–5	(Brazil) Guilherme Clezar (Brazil) Tiago Lopes	(Brazil) João Pedro Sorgi (Brazil) Tiago Lopes	(Brazil) Daniel Dutra da Silva (Brazil) André Miele (Brazil) Eduardo Piragine (Brazil) Fabrício Neis
August 27	Croatia F9 Futures; Osijek, Croatia; Clay $10,000	(Serbia) Ivan Bjelica; 6–3, 6–2	(Bosnia and Herzegovina) Aldin Šetkić	(Bosnia and Herzegovina) Tomislav Brkić (Croatia) Duje Kekez	(Serbia) Ilija Vučić (Croatia) Mate Delić (France) Nicolas Rosenzweig (Croatia) Joško Topić
August 27	Croatia F9 Futures; Osijek, Croatia; Clay $10,000	(Bosnia and Herzegovina) Tomislav Brkić (Bosnia and Herzegovina) Aldin Šetkić; 6–4, 6–1	(Serbia) Ivan Bjelica (Croatia) Matej Sabanov	(Bosnia and Herzegovina) Tomislav Brkić (Croatia) Duje Kekez	(Serbia) Ilija Vučić (Croatia) Mate Delić (France) Nicolas Rosenzweig (Croatia) Joško Topić
August 27	Ecuador F3 Futures; Quito, Ecuador; Clay $10,000	(Peru) Mauricio Echazú; 7–6^{(7–3)}, 7–5	(Ecuador) Julio César Campozano	(El Salvador) Marcelo Arévalo (Chile) Guillermo Rivera Aránguiz	(Mexico) Miguel Gallardo Valles (Mexico) César Ramírez (Peru) Duilio Beretta (Peru) Sergio Galdós
August 27	Ecuador F3 Futures; Quito, Ecuador; Clay $10,000	(Peru) Duilio Beretta (Peru) Sergio Galdós; 6–2, 6–1	(Peru) Mauricio Echazú (Chile) Guillermo Rivera Aránguiz	(El Salvador) Marcelo Arévalo (Chile) Guillermo Rivera Aránguiz	(Mexico) Miguel Gallardo Valles (Mexico) César Ramírez (Peru) Duilio Beretta (Peru) Sergio Galdós
August 27	Germany F16 Futures; Kenn, Germany; Clay $10,000	(France) Jonathan Eysseric; 7–5, 6–0	(Germany) Steven Moneke	(Russia) Alexey Vatutin (Germany) Nico Matic	(France) François-Arthur Vibert (Germany) Richard Waite (Germany) Yannick Staschen (Bosnia and Herzegovina) Elmar Ejupovic
August 27	Germany F16 Futures; Kenn, Germany; Clay $10,000	(Philippines) Ruben Gonzales (Australia) Chris Letcher; 6–1, 3–6, [10–3]	(Germany) Steven Moneke (Germany) Ralph Regus	(Russia) Alexey Vatutin (Germany) Nico Matic	(France) François-Arthur Vibert (Germany) Richard Waite (Germany) Yannick Staschen (Bosnia and Herzegovina) Elmar Ejupovic
August 27	Great Britain F14 Futures; Chiswick, United Kingdom; Hard $10,000	(France) Jules Marie; 6–3, 6–3	(United Kingdom) Tom Burn	(United Kingdom) James Marsalek (United Kingdom) Daniel Evans	(South Africa) Ruan Roelofse (United Kingdom) Edward Corrie (United Kingdom) Richard Bloomfield (United Kingdom) Lewis Burton
August 27	Great Britain F14 Futures; Chiswick, United Kingdom; Hard $10,000	(United Kingdom) David Rice (South Africa) Ruan Roelofse; 7–5, 7–6^{(9–7)}	(United Kingdom) Harry Meehan (United Kingdom) Stefan Sterland-Markovic	(United Kingdom) James Marsalek (United Kingdom) Daniel Evans	(South Africa) Ruan Roelofse (United Kingdom) Edward Corrie (United Kingdom) Richard Bloomfield (United Kingdom) Lewis Burton
August 27	Iran F1 Futures; Esfahan, Iran; Clay $15,000	(India) Sriram Balaji; 6–3, 6–2	(India) Vijay Sundar Prashanth	(India) Ranjeet Virali-Murugesan (Uzbekistan) Sarvar Ikramov	(Syria) Marc Abdulnour (Iran) Amirvala Madanchi (Czech Republic) Michal Schmid (India) Jeevan Nedunchezhiyan
August 27	Iran F1 Futures; Esfahan, Iran; Clay $15,000	(Czech Republic) Roman Jebavý (Czech Republic) Michal Schmid; 6–4, 6–4	(India) Sriram Balaji (India) Ranjeet Virali-Murugesan	(India) Ranjeet Virali-Murugesan (Uzbekistan) Sarvar Ikramov	(Syria) Marc Abdulnour (Iran) Amirvala Madanchi (Czech Republic) Michal Schmid (India) Jeevan Nedunchezhiyan
August 27	Italy F24 Futures; Piombino, Italy; Hard $15,000	(Chile) Jorge Aguilar; 3–6, 7–6^{(7–4)}, 6–3	(Italy) Claudio Grassi	(France) Yannick Jankovits (France) Julien Obry	(France) Antoine Benneteau (France) Alexandre Sidorenko (Italy) Salvatore Caruso (Italy) Edoardo Eremin
August 27	Italy F24 Futures; Piombino, Italy; Hard $15,000	(United States) Adham El-Effendi (United Kingdom) Darren Walsh; 6–3, 6–1	(France) Yannick Jankovits (France) Alexandre Sidorenko	(France) Yannick Jankovits (France) Julien Obry	(France) Antoine Benneteau (France) Alexandre Sidorenko (Italy) Salvatore Caruso (Italy) Edoardo Eremin
August 27	Netherlands F6 Futures; Rotterdam, Netherlands; Clay $10,000	(Netherlands) Jesse Huta Galung; 6–2, 7–6^{(7–3)}	(France) Axel Michon	(Russia) Victor Baluda (Austria) Gerald Melzer	(Netherlands) Wesley Koolhof (Sweden) Markus Eriksson (New Zealand) Sebastian Lavie (Republic of Ireland) Sam Barry
August 27	Netherlands F6 Futures; Rotterdam, Netherlands; Clay $10,000	(Netherlands) Stephan Fransen (Austria) Gerald Melzer; 6–3, 7–6^{(7–3)}	(Mexico) Miguel Ángel Reyes-Varela (Mexico) Bruno Rodríguez	(Russia) Victor Baluda (Austria) Gerald Melzer	(Netherlands) Wesley Koolhof (Sweden) Markus Eriksson (New Zealand) Sebastian Lavie (Republic of Ireland) Sam Barry
August 27	Poland F6 Futures; Legnica, Poland; Clay $10,000	(Poland) Michał Przysiężny; 6–0, 6–2	(Poland) Adam Chadaj	(Czech Republic) Adam Pavlásek (Poland) Grzegorz Panfil	(Poland) Marcin Gawron (India) Prajnesh Gunneswaran (Czech Republic) Jan Šátral (Bulgaria) Alexandar Lazov
August 27	Poland F6 Futures; Legnica, Poland; Clay $10,000	(Poland) Marcin Gawron (Poland) Grzegorz Panfil; Walkover	(Czech Republic) Adam Pavlásek (Czech Republic) Jan Šátral	(Czech Republic) Adam Pavlásek (Poland) Grzegorz Panfil	(Poland) Marcin Gawron (India) Prajnesh Gunneswaran (Czech Republic) Jan Šátral (Bulgaria) Alexandar Lazov
August 27	Romania F9 Futures; Brașov, Romania; Clay $10,000	(Romania) Victor Crivoi; 6–4, 6–3	(Chile) Cristóbal Saavedra Corvalán	(Romania) Răzvan Sabău (Chile) Hans Podlipnik Castillo	(Romania) Vasile-Alexandru Ghilea (Ukraine) Denys Mylokostov (Romania) Teodor-Dacian Crăciun (Moldova) Maxim Dubarenco
August 27	Romania F9 Futures; Brașov, Romania; Clay $10,000	(Romania) Teodor-Dacian Crăciun (Romania) Petru-Alexandru Luncanu; 3–6, 6–1, [10–6]	(Czech Republic) Michal Konečný (Chile) Hans Podlipnik Castillo	(Romania) Răzvan Sabău (Chile) Hans Podlipnik Castillo	(Romania) Vasile-Alexandru Ghilea (Ukraine) Denys Mylokostov (Romania) Teodor-Dacian Crăciun (Moldova) Maxim Dubarenco
August 27	Russia F14 Futures; Lermontov, Russia; Clay $10,000	(Russia) Richard Muzaev; 5–7, 6–1, 7–5	(Russia) Andrey Kumantsov	(Russia) Mikhail Vaks (Russia) Sergei Krotiouk	(Russia) Shalva Dzhanashia (Russia) Beka Komakhidze (Russia) Alexander Pavlioutchenkov (Russia) Aleksandr Lobkov
August 27	Russia F14 Futures; Lermontov, Russia; Clay $10,000	(Russia) Andrey Kumantsov (Russia) Alexander Pavlioutchenkov; 6–3, 6–4	(Russia) Alexander Perfilov (Russia) Yan Sabanin	(Russia) Mikhail Vaks (Russia) Sergei Krotiouk	(Russia) Shalva Dzhanashia (Russia) Beka Komakhidze (Russia) Alexander Pavlioutchenkov (Russia) Aleksandr Lobkov
August 27	Spain F26 Futures; Santander, Spain; Clay $15,000	(Spain) Gabriel Trujillo Soler; 6–2, 6–3	(Spain) Roberto Carballés Baena	(Spain) José Checa Calvo (France) Lucas Pouille	(Spain) Miguel Ángel López Jaén (Spain) Enrique López Pérez (Venezuela) David Souto (Spain) David Estruch
August 27	Spain F26 Futures; Santander, Spain; Clay $15,000	(Spain) Miguel Ángel López Jaén (Spain) Gabriel Trujillo Soler; 6–3, 6–7^{(7–9)}, [10–5]	(Spain) Iván Arenas-Gualda (Spain) Enrique López Pérez	(Spain) José Checa Calvo (France) Lucas Pouille	(Spain) Miguel Ángel López Jaén (Spain) Enrique López Pérez (Venezuela) David Souto (Spain) David Estruch

=== September ===
Week of	Tournament	Winner	Runners-up	Semifinalists	Quarterfinalists
September 3	Argentina F23 Futures; La Rioja, Argentina; Clay $10,000	(Argentina) Pablo Caldón; 6–3, 6–1	(Argentina) Juan Ignacio Londero	(Argentina) Facundo Mena (Bolivia) Hugo Dellien	(Argentina) Tomás Lipovšek Puches (Argentina) Joaquín-Jesús Monteferrario (Argentina) Juan Vázquez-Valenzuela (Argentina) Juan Pablo Paz
September 3	Argentina F23 Futures; La Rioja, Argentina; Clay $10,000	(Argentina) Juan Ignacio Londero (Argentina) Mateo Nicolás Martínez; 3–6, 6–3, [10–8]	(Argentina) Gabriel Alejandro Hidalgo (Argentina) Mauricio Pérez Mota	(Argentina) Facundo Mena (Bolivia) Hugo Dellien	(Argentina) Tomás Lipovšek Puches (Argentina) Joaquín-Jesús Monteferrario (Argentina) Juan Vázquez-Valenzuela (Argentina) Juan Pablo Paz
September 3	Australia F6 Futures; Alice Springs, Australia; Hard $15,000	(Australia) Matthew Barton; 7–6^{(7–3)}, 6–3	(Australia) Samuel Groth	(Australia) Luke Saville (Australia) Michael Look	(Australia) Adam Feeney (Australia) Thanasi Kokkinakis (Australia) Nick Lindahl (Japan) Kento Takeuchi
September 3	Australia F6 Futures; Alice Springs, Australia; Hard $15,000	(Australia) Adam Feeney (Australia) Nick Lindahl; 4–6, 6–2, [10–8]	(Australia) Samuel Groth (New Zealand) Michael Venus	(Australia) Luke Saville (Australia) Michael Look	(Australia) Adam Feeney (Australia) Thanasi Kokkinakis (Australia) Nick Lindahl (Japan) Kento Takeuchi
September 3	Austria F9 Futures; Vogau, Austria; Clay $10,000	(Slovenia) Blaž Rola; 6–2, 7–6^{(7–5)}	(Austria) Mario Haider-Maurer	(Austria) Tristan-Samuel Weissborn (Austria) Bastian Trinker	(Austria) Patrick Ofner (Slovakia) Michal Pažický (Austria) Bjorn Propst (Czech Republic) Adam Pavlásek
September 3	Austria F9 Futures; Vogau, Austria; Clay $10,000	(Philippines) Ruben Gonzales (Slovenia) Blaž Rola; 6–2, 6–2	(Austria) Lukas Jastraunig (Austria) Tristan-Samuel Weissborn	(Austria) Tristan-Samuel Weissborn (Austria) Bastian Trinker	(Austria) Patrick Ofner (Slovakia) Michal Pažický (Austria) Bjorn Propst (Czech Republic) Adam Pavlásek
September 3	Brazil F24 Futures; Arapongas, Brazil; Clay $10,000	(Brazil) Thales Turini; 7–6^{(7–2)}, 4–6, 7–6^{(7–5)}	(Brazil) José Pereira	(Brazil) Tiago Lopes (Brazil) Fabrício Neis	(Brazil) Ricardo Siggia (Brazil) Daniel Dutra da Silva (Brazil) Carlos Eduardo Severino (Brazil) Andre Napolitano
September 3	Brazil F24 Futures; Arapongas, Brazil; Clay $10,000	(Brazil) Rodrigo-Antonio Grilli (Brazil) Diego Matos; 7–5, 6–3	(Brazil) Filipe Brandao (Brazil) Ricardo Siggia	(Brazil) Tiago Lopes (Brazil) Fabrício Neis	(Brazil) Ricardo Siggia (Brazil) Daniel Dutra da Silva (Brazil) Carlos Eduardo Severino (Brazil) Andre Napolitano
September 3	Canada F7 Futures; Toronto, Canada; Clay $15,000	(Canada) Peter Polansky; 6–4, 6–4	(United States) Chase Buchanan	(Hungary) Márton Fucsovics (Australia) Carsten Ball	(Canada) Milan Pokrajac (United States) Bjorn Fratangelo (United States) Eric Quigley (Australia) John-Patrick Smith
September 3	Canada F7 Futures; Toronto, Canada; Clay $15,000	(Australia) Carsten Ball (Canada) Peter Polansky; 6–7^{(2–7)}, 6–4, [11–9]	(United States) Sekou Bangoura (United States) Bjorn Fratangelo	(Hungary) Márton Fucsovics (Australia) Carsten Ball	(Canada) Milan Pokrajac (United States) Bjorn Fratangelo (United States) Eric Quigley (Australia) John-Patrick Smith
September 3	France F15 Futures; Bagnères-de-Bigorre, France; Hard $15,000+H	(France) Julien Obry; 6–4, 6–3	(Belgium) Niels Desein	(France) Fabrice Martin (France) Mathieu Rodrigues	(United Kingdom) Edward Corrie (France) Jonathan Eysseric (France) Alexandre Sidorenko (France) Charles-Antoine Brézac
September 3	France F15 Futures; Bagnères-de-Bigorre, France; Hard $15,000+H	(Republic of Ireland) James Cluskey (France) Fabrice Martin; 6–7^{(4–7)}, 7–5, [11–9]	(France) Charles-Antoine Brézac (France) Simon Cauvard	(France) Fabrice Martin (France) Mathieu Rodrigues	(United Kingdom) Edward Corrie (France) Jonathan Eysseric (France) Alexandre Sidorenko (France) Charles-Antoine Brézac
September 3	Georgia F1 Futures; Tbilisi, Georgia; Clay $15,000	(France) Laurent Recouderc; 6–1, 7–5	(Italy) Matteo Marrai	(Austria) Peter Goldsteiner (Croatia) Toni Androić	(Poland) Piotr Gadomski (Georgia (country)) Aleksandre Metreveli (Czech Republic) Jan Blecha (Poland) Arkadiusz Kocyła
September 3	Georgia F1 Futures; Tbilisi, Georgia; Clay $15,000	(Ukraine) Vladyslav Manafov (Belarus) Yaraslav Shyla; 6–1, 7–6^{(7–3)}	(Estonia) Vladimir Ivanov (Russia) Ilia Shatskiy	(Austria) Peter Goldsteiner (Croatia) Toni Androić	(Poland) Piotr Gadomski (Georgia (country)) Aleksandre Metreveli (Czech Republic) Jan Blecha (Poland) Arkadiusz Kocyła
September 3	Great Britain F15 Futures; London-Roehampton, United Kingdom; Hard $10,000	(United Kingdom) Daniel Evans; 6–3, 6–1	(United Kingdom) Joshua Milton	(United Kingdom) James Marsalek (United Kingdom) Matthew Short	(New Zealand) Marcus Daniell (South Africa) Ruan Roelofse (South Africa) Jean Andersen (United Kingdom) James Ireland
September 3	Great Britain F15 Futures; London-Roehampton, United Kingdom; Hard $10,000	(South Africa) Jean Andersen (South Africa) Ruan Roelofse; 6–2, 4–6, [2–10]	(New Zealand) Marcus Daniell (Mexico) Manuel Sánchez	(United Kingdom) James Marsalek (United Kingdom) Matthew Short	(New Zealand) Marcus Daniell (South Africa) Ruan Roelofse (South Africa) Jean Andersen (United Kingdom) James Ireland
September 3	Iran F2 Futures; Esfahan, Iran; Clay $15,000	(Czech Republic) Michal Schmid; Walkover	(Uzbekistan) Sarvar Ikramov	(Syria) Issam Al Tawil (Iran) Shahin Khaledan	(India) Sriram Balaji (India) Vijay Sundar Prashanth (India) Ranjeet Virali-Murugesan (Syria) Marc Abdulnour
September 3	Iran F2 Futures; Esfahan, Iran; Clay $15,000	(India) Sriram Balaji (India) Ranjeet Virali-Murugesan; 6–1, 6–1	(Uzbekistan) Sarvar Ikramov (Uzbekistan) Sergey Shipilov	(Syria) Issam Al Tawil (Iran) Shahin Khaledan	(India) Sriram Balaji (India) Vijay Sundar Prashanth (India) Ranjeet Virali-Murugesan (Syria) Marc Abdulnour
September 3	Italy F25 Futures; Trieste, Italy; Clay $10,000	(Slovakia) Jozef Kovalík; 7–6^{(7–2)}, 6–4	(Switzerland) Sandro Ehrat	(Italy) Enrico Fioravante (Italy) Daniele Giorgini	(Italy) Filippo Baldi (Germany) Peter Heller (Italy) Giacomo Oradini (Italy) Alessandro Bega
September 3	Italy F25 Futures; Trieste, Italy; Clay $10,000	(Italy) Enrico Fioravante (Italy) Matteo Volante; 6–4, 6–1	(Germany) Pirmin Hänle (New Zealand) Matt Simpson	(Italy) Enrico Fioravante (Italy) Daniele Giorgini	(Italy) Filippo Baldi (Germany) Peter Heller (Italy) Giacomo Oradini (Italy) Alessandro Bega
September 3	Mexico F9 Futures; Manzanillo, Mexico; Hard $10,000	(Barbados) Darian King; 6–4, 5–0 Ret.	(Brazil) Alexandre Schnitman	(Mexico) Mauricio Astorga (Venezuela) Luis David Martínez	(Australia) Matheson Klein (Guatemala) Christopher Díaz Figueroa (Mexico) Luis Enrique Barrientos (El Salvador) Marcelo Arévalo
September 3	Mexico F9 Futures; Manzanillo, Mexico; Hard $10,000	(New Zealand) Marvin Barker (United States) Adam El Mihdawy; 7–5, 6–1	(Mexico) Mauricio Astorga (Mexico) Luis Patiño	(Mexico) Mauricio Astorga (Venezuela) Luis David Martínez	(Australia) Matheson Klein (Guatemala) Christopher Díaz Figueroa (Mexico) Luis Enrique Barrientos (El Salvador) Marcelo Arévalo
September 3	Netherlands F7 Futures; Wierden, Netherlands; Clay $10,000	(Germany) Ivo Mijic; 6–1, 2–6, 6–3	(Sweden) Patrik Brydolf	(Netherlands) Kevin Griekspoor (France) François-Arthur Vibert	(Chile) Laslo Urrutia Fuentes (Republic of Ireland) Sam Barry (Germany) Jeremy Jahn (Russia) Victor Baluda
September 3	Netherlands F7 Futures; Wierden, Netherlands; Clay $10,000	(Russia) Victor Baluda (Netherlands) Yannick Ebbinghaus; 6–3, 6–2	(Netherlands) Sander Arends (Netherlands) Elroy Middendorp	(Netherlands) Kevin Griekspoor (France) François-Arthur Vibert	(Chile) Laslo Urrutia Fuentes (Republic of Ireland) Sam Barry (Germany) Jeremy Jahn (Russia) Victor Baluda
September 3	Serbia F11 Futures; Novi Sad, Serbia; Clay $10,000	(Bosnia and Herzegovina) Aldin Šetkić; 6–4, 6–0	(Serbia) Denis Bejtulahi	(Serbia) Ivan Milivojević (Serbia) Uroš Petronijević	(Croatia) Mate Delić (Serbia) Dejan Katić (Hungary) Levente Gödry (Belgium) Alexandre Folie
September 3	Serbia F11 Futures; Novi Sad, Serbia; Clay $10,000	(Serbia) Denis Bejtulahi (Serbia) Slavko Bjelica; 6–2, 6–4	(Belgium) Alexandre Folie (Belgium) Alec Witmeur	(Serbia) Ivan Milivojević (Serbia) Uroš Petronijević	(Croatia) Mate Delić (Serbia) Dejan Katić (Hungary) Levente Gödry (Belgium) Alexandre Folie
September 3	Spain F27 Futures; Oviedo, Spain; Clay $15,000	(Serbia) Nikola Ćirić; 6–3, 6–2	(Spain) José Checa Calvo	(Spain) Roberto Carballés Baena (Venezuela) David Souto	(Spain) Enrique López Pérez (Spain) Miguel Ángel López Jaén (Spain) Andrés Artuñedo (Spain) David Estruch
September 3	Spain F27 Futures; Oviedo, Spain; Clay $15,000	(Spain) Miguel Ángel López Jaén (Spain) Gabriel Trujillo Soler; 6–2, 1–6, [11–9]	(Spain) Juan-Samuel Arauzo-Martínez (Spain) David Pérez Sanz	(Spain) Roberto Carballés Baena (Venezuela) David Souto	(Spain) Enrique López Pérez (Spain) Miguel Ángel López Jaén (Spain) Andrés Artuñedo (Spain) David Estruch
September 3	Turkey F34 Futures; Antalya-Belconti, Turkey; Hard $10,000	(Australia) Brydan Klein; 2–6, 7–6^{(9–7)}, 6–1	(Egypt) Mohamed Safwat	(Kuwait) Abdullah Maqdes (Zimbabwe) Takanyi Garanganga	(Germany) Dominik Schulz (Czech Republic) Honza Mašík (Malaysia) Mohamed Nazim Khan (Switzerland) Luca Margaroli
September 3	Turkey F34 Futures; Antalya-Belconti, Turkey; Hard $10,000	(Turkey) Tuna Altuna (Australia) Brydan Klein; 6–3, 6–4	(Slovakia) Marko Daniš (United Kingdom) George Morgan	(Kuwait) Abdullah Maqdes (Zimbabwe) Takanyi Garanganga	(Germany) Dominik Schulz (Czech Republic) Honza Mašík (Malaysia) Mohamed Nazim Khan (Switzerland) Luca Margaroli
September 10	Argentina F24 Futures; San Juan, Argentina; Carpet $10,000	(Argentina) Leandro Migani; 6–3, 6–1	(Argentina) Juan Vázquez-Valenzuela	(Argentina) Gabriel Alejandro Hidalgo (Italy) Stefano Travaglia	(Argentina) Guillermo Carry (Italy) Federico Gaio (Argentina) Tomás Lipovšek Puches (Argentina) Tomás Buchhass
September 10	Argentina F24 Futures; San Juan, Argentina; Carpet $10,000	(Argentina) Juan Ignacio Londero (Argentina) Mateo Nicolás Martínez; 6–2, 7–6^{(8–6)}	(Argentina) Tomás Lipovšek Puches (Argentina) Juan Pablo Ortiz	(Argentina) Gabriel Alejandro Hidalgo (Italy) Stefano Travaglia	(Argentina) Guillermo Carry (Italy) Federico Gaio (Argentina) Tomás Lipovšek Puches (Argentina) Tomás Buchhass
September 10	Australia F7 Futures; Happy Valley, Australia; Hard $15,000	(Australia) Alex Bolt; 5–7, 6–3, 6–1	(Australia) Adam Feeney	(Australia) James Lemke (Australia) Luke Saville	(Australia) Ryan Thomas (Japan) Kento Takeuchi (Australia) Matthew Barton (Australia) Michael Look
September 10	Australia F7 Futures; Happy Valley, Australia; Hard $15,000	(Australia) Luke Saville (Australia) Andrew Whittington; 6–3, 6–2	(Japan) Yuichi Ito (Japan) Yusuke Watanuki	(Australia) James Lemke (Australia) Luke Saville	(Australia) Ryan Thomas (Japan) Kento Takeuchi (Australia) Matthew Barton (Australia) Michael Look
September 10	Bolivia F1 Futures; Cochabamba, Bolivia; Clay $10,000	(Argentina) Juan-Pablo Amado; 6–3, 6–1	(Bolivia) Federico Zeballos	(Argentina) Sebastián Exequiel Pini (Argentina) Federico Coria	(Bolivia) Mauricio Estívariz (Argentina) Francisco Arrechea (Bolivia) Marco-Antonio Rojas (Bolivia) Mauricio Doria-Medina
September 10	Bolivia F1 Futures; Cochabamba, Bolivia; Clay $10,000	(Bolivia) Hugo Dellien (Bolivia) Mauricio Doria-Medina; 3–6, 6–3, [10–7]	(Argentina) Juan-Pablo Amado (Japan) Ryusei Makiguchi	(Argentina) Sebastián Exequiel Pini (Argentina) Federico Coria	(Bolivia) Mauricio Estívariz (Argentina) Francisco Arrechea (Bolivia) Marco-Antonio Rojas (Bolivia) Mauricio Doria-Medina
September 10	Canada F8 Futures; Toronto, Canada; Hard $15,000	(South Africa) Fritz Wolmarans; 6–3, 7–6^{(7–3)}	(Hungary) Márton Fucsovics	(United States) Chase Buchanan (United States) Christian Harrison	(United States) Sekou Bangoura (Canada) George Jecminek (United States) Eric Quigley (United States) Bjorn Fratangelo
September 10	Canada F8 Futures; Toronto, Canada; Hard $15,000	(Hungary) Márton Fucsovics (Croatia) Ante Pavić; 6–2, 6–4	(United States) Chase Buchanan (United States) Tennys Sandgren	(United States) Chase Buchanan (United States) Christian Harrison	(United States) Sekou Bangoura (Canada) George Jecminek (United States) Eric Quigley (United States) Bjorn Fratangelo
September 10	France F16 Futures; Mulhouse, France; Hard (indoor) $15,000+H	(France) Marc Gicquel; 6–4, 6–3	(France) Grégoire Burquier	(Germany) Tim Pütz (France) Émilien Firmin	(France) Alexandre Penaud (France) Nicolas Renavand (France) Rudy Coco (France) Alexandre Sidorenko
September 10	France F16 Futures; Mulhouse, France; Hard (indoor) $15,000+H	(France) Charles-Antoine Brézac (France) Alexandre Penaud; 5–7, 6–1, [10–8]	(France) Kevin Botti (France) Grégoire Burquier	(Germany) Tim Pütz (France) Émilien Firmin	(France) Alexandre Penaud (France) Nicolas Renavand (France) Rudy Coco (France) Alexandre Sidorenko
September 10	Georgia F2 Futures; Tbilisi, Georgia; Clay $15,000	(Georgia (country)) Nikoloz Basilashvili; 6–3, 4–6, 7–6^{(7–1)}	(Croatia) Toni Androić	(Czech Republic) Jiří Veselý (France) Laurent Recouderc	(Poland) Piotr Gadomski (Estonia) Vladimir Ivanov (Italy) Matteo Marrai (Chile) Hans Podlipnik Castillo
September 10	Georgia F2 Futures; Tbilisi, Georgia; Clay $15,000	(Ukraine) Vladyslav Manafov (Belarus) Yaraslav Shyla; 6–2, 6–4	(Georgia (country)) Nodar Itonishvili (Georgia (country)) David Kvernadze	(Czech Republic) Jiří Veselý (France) Laurent Recouderc	(Poland) Piotr Gadomski (Estonia) Vladimir Ivanov (Italy) Matteo Marrai (Chile) Hans Podlipnik Castillo
September 10	Great Britain F16 Futures; Nottingham, United Kingdom; Hard $10,000	(United Kingdom) Daniel Evans; 7–6^{(7–4)}, 7–6^{(7–2)}	(United Kingdom) Richard Bloomfield	(United Kingdom) Edward Corrie (United Kingdom) Tom Burn	(United Kingdom) Neil Pauffley (United Kingdom) Richard Gabb (United Kingdom) Marcus Willis (United Kingdom) Luke Bambridge
September 10	Great Britain F16 Futures; Nottingham, United Kingdom; Hard $10,000	(United Kingdom) Edward Corrie (United Kingdom) James Marsalek; 5–7, 6–3, [10–7]	(United Kingdom) Miles Bugby (Republic of Ireland) Daniel Glancy	(United Kingdom) Edward Corrie (United Kingdom) Tom Burn	(United Kingdom) Neil Pauffley (United Kingdom) Richard Gabb (United Kingdom) Marcus Willis (United Kingdom) Luke Bambridge
September 10	Italy F26 Futures; Siena, Italy; Clay $10,000	(Italy) Riccardo Bellotti; 6–2, retired	(Italy) Marco Crugnola	(Italy) Andrea Arnaboldi (France) Romain Arneodo	(Italy) Alessandro Bega (Italy) Viktor Galović (Italy) Enrico Fioravante (France) Jérôme Inzerillo
September 10	Italy F26 Futures; Siena, Italy; Clay $10,000	(France) Romain Arneodo (France) Jérôme Inzerillo; 6–2, 6–2	(Italy) Marco Crugnola (Russia) Mikhail Vasiliev	(Italy) Andrea Arnaboldi (France) Romain Arneodo	(Italy) Alessandro Bega (Italy) Viktor Galović (Italy) Enrico Fioravante (France) Jérôme Inzerillo
September 10	Mexico F10 Futures; Manzanillo, Mexico; Hard $10,000	(United States) Adam El Mihdawy; 7–6^{(7–2)}, 6–2	(El Salvador) Marcelo Arévalo	(Barbados) Darian King (Italy) Gianluigi Quinzi	(Venezuela) Luis David Martínez (Guatemala) Christopher Díaz Figueroa (Japan) Yoshihito Nishioka (Australia) Matheson Klein
September 10	Mexico F10 Futures; Manzanillo, Mexico; Hard $10,000	(El Salvador) Marcelo Arévalo (Mexico) Miguel Ángel Reyes-Varela; 6–1, 7–5	(Guatemala) Christopher Díaz Figueroa (Barbados) Darian King	(Barbados) Darian King (Italy) Gianluigi Quinzi	(Venezuela) Luis David Martínez (Guatemala) Christopher Díaz Figueroa (Japan) Yoshihito Nishioka (Australia) Matheson Klein
September 10	Serbia F12 Futures; Subotica, Serbia; Clay $10,000	(Slovakia) Jozef Kovalík; 3–6, 6–0, 6–3	(Serbia) Laslo Djere	(Serbia) Danilo Petrović (Austria) Marc Rath	(France) Lucas Pouille (Hungary) Gergely Madarász (Austria) Nicolas Reissig (Serbia) Miki Janković
September 10	Serbia F12 Futures; Subotica, Serbia; Clay $10,000	(Slovakia) Jozef Kovalík (Czech Republic) Otakar Lucák; 7–6^{(7–1)}, 6–4	(Austria) Marc Rath (Austria) Nicolas Reissig	(Serbia) Danilo Petrović (Austria) Marc Rath	(France) Lucas Pouille (Hungary) Gergely Madarász (Austria) Nicolas Reissig (Serbia) Miki Janković
September 10	Spain F28 Futures; Getafe, Spain; Hard $10,000	(Russia) Aleksandr Lobkov; 6–3, 7–6^{(7–2)}	(Spain) Oriol Roca Batalla	(Spain) Jaime Pulgar-García (Spain) Sergio Magro Moreno	(Spain) Iván Arenas-Gualda (India) Mohit Mayur Jayaprakash (Argentina) Leonel Videla (Spain) Miguel Ángel López Jaén
September 10	Spain F28 Futures; Getafe, Spain; Hard $10,000	(Spain) Miguel Ángel López Jaén (Spain) Oriol Roca Batalla; 7–6^{(8–6)}, 2–6, [10–8]	(Spain) Iván Arenas-Gualda (Spain) Enrique López Pérez	(Spain) Jaime Pulgar-García (Spain) Sergio Magro Moreno	(Spain) Iván Arenas-Gualda (India) Mohit Mayur Jayaprakash (Argentina) Leonel Videla (Spain) Miguel Ángel López Jaén
September 10	Sweden F4 Futures; Uppsala, Sweden; Hard (indoor) $10,000	(France) Hugo Nys; 6–0, 5–7, 6–3	(Sweden) Robin Olin	(United Kingdom) Joshua Milton (Sweden) Patrik Brydolf	(Sweden) Pablo Figueroa (Sweden) Lucas Renard (Sweden) Viktor Stjern (France) Matthieu Roy
September 10	Sweden F4 Futures; Uppsala, Sweden; Hard (indoor) $10,000	(Sweden) Milos Sekulic (Denmark) Søren Wedege; 6–2, 7–6^{(7–1)}	(Sweden) Daniel Berta (Sweden) Nicklas Szymanski	(United Kingdom) Joshua Milton (Sweden) Patrik Brydolf	(Sweden) Pablo Figueroa (Sweden) Lucas Renard (Sweden) Viktor Stjern (France) Matthieu Roy
September 10	Turkey F35 Futures; Antalya-Belconti, Turkey; Hard $10,000	(Zimbabwe) Takanyi Garanganga; 3–0 Ret.	(Austria) Nikolaus Moser	(Moldova) Andrei Ciumac (France) Romain Sichez	(Austria) Dominic Thiem (Belarus) Pavel Filin (Germany) Sebastian Sachs (Ukraine) Vadim Alekseenko
September 10	Turkey F35 Futures; Antalya-Belconti, Turkey; Hard $10,000	(Russia) Kirill Dmitriev (Switzerland) Luca Margaroli; 6–4, 6–0	(Turkey) Tuna Altuna (Austria) Nikolaus Moser	(Moldova) Andrei Ciumac (France) Romain Sichez	(Austria) Dominic Thiem (Belarus) Pavel Filin (Germany) Sebastian Sachs (Ukraine) Vadim Alekseenko
September 10	USA F24 Futures; Claremont, United States; Hard $10,000	(United States) Daniel Kosakowski; 6–3, 6–1	(India) Prakash Amritraj	(Tunisia) Mohamed Abid (United States) Daniel Nguyen	(United Kingdom) Alex Bogdanovic (United States) Jeff Dadamo (United States) Dennis Lajola (United States) Jason Jung
September 10	USA F24 Futures; Claremont, United States; Hard $10,000	(United States) Devin Britton (United States) Reid Carleton; 4–6, 7–5, [10–6]	(United States) Jeff Dadamo (United States) Kyle McMorrow	(Tunisia) Mohamed Abid (United States) Daniel Nguyen	(United Kingdom) Alex Bogdanovic (United States) Jeff Dadamo (United States) Dennis Lajola (United States) Jason Jung
September 10	Vietnam F4 Futures; Bình Dương, Vietnam; Hard $10,000	(Japan) Junn Mitsuhashi; 2–6, 7–5, 7–5	(South Korea) Cho Soong-jae	(Thailand) Wishaya Trongcharoenchaikul (South Korea) Nam Hyun-woo	(South Korea) Kim Woo-ram (Japan) Hiroyasu Ehara (Germany) Maximilian Dinslaken (India) Sidharth Rawat
September 10	Vietnam F4 Futures; Bình Dương, Vietnam; Hard $10,000	(Thailand) Nuttanon Kadchapanan (Thailand) Kittiphong Wachiramanowong; 6–0, 6–0	(South Korea) Cho Soong-jae (South Korea) Choi Dong-whee	(Thailand) Wishaya Trongcharoenchaikul (South Korea) Nam Hyun-woo	(South Korea) Kim Woo-ram (Japan) Hiroyasu Ehara (Germany) Maximilian Dinslaken (India) Sidharth Rawat
September 17	Australia F8 Futures; Port Pirie, Australia; Hard $15,000	(Australia) Matt Reid; 6–3, 3–6, 6–3	(Australia) Adam Feeney	(Australia) Benjamin Mitchell (New Zealand) Michael Venus	(Australia) Luke Saville (Australia) Jacob Grills (Australia) Bradley Mousley (Australia) Matthew Barton
September 17	Australia F8 Futures; Port Pirie, Australia; Hard $15,000	(Australia) Jay Andrijic (Australia) Adam Feeney; 6–2, 6–2	(Australia) Alex Bolt (Australia) Jack Schipanski	(Australia) Benjamin Mitchell (New Zealand) Michael Venus	(Australia) Luke Saville (Australia) Jacob Grills (Australia) Bradley Mousley (Australia) Matthew Barton
September 17	Bolivia F2 Futures; Trinidad, Bolivia; Clay $10,000+H	(Argentina) Juan-Pablo Amado; 6–2, 6–1	(Bolivia) Hugo Dellien	(Colombia) Sebastián Serrano (Japan) Ryusei Makiguchi	(Argentina) Valentín Florez (Argentina) Sebastián Exequiel Pini (Argentina) Matias Castro (Argentina) Facundo Mena
September 17	Bolivia F2 Futures; Trinidad, Bolivia; Clay $10,000+H	(Argentina) Facundo Mena (Colombia) Sebastián Serrano; 6–3, 7–5	(Bolivia) Hugo Dellien (Bolivia) Murkel Alejandro Dellien Velasco	(Colombia) Sebastián Serrano (Japan) Ryusei Makiguchi	(Argentina) Valentín Florez (Argentina) Sebastián Exequiel Pini (Argentina) Matias Castro (Argentina) Facundo Mena
September 17	Brazil F26 Futures; Caxias do Sul, Brazil; Clay $10,000	(Brazil) Daniel Dutra da Silva; 6–7^{(4–7)}, 6–2, 6–2	(Brazil) Eduardo Dischinger	(Chile) Nicolás Gustavo Kauer (Brazil) Fabrício Neis	(Brazil) José Pereira (Brazil) Augusto Laranja (Chile) Jorge Montero (Brazil) Thales Turini
September 17	Brazil F26 Futures; Caxias do Sul, Brazil; Clay $10,000	(Brazil) Daniel Dutra da Silva (Brazil) Caio Silva; 6–4, 6–2	(Brazil) Idio Escobar (Brazil) Augusto Laranja	(Chile) Nicolás Gustavo Kauer (Brazil) Fabrício Neis	(Brazil) José Pereira (Brazil) Augusto Laranja (Chile) Jorge Montero (Brazil) Thales Turini
September 17	Canada F9 Futures; Markham, Canada; Hard (indoor) $15,000	(United States) Tennys Sandgren; 6–4, 6–3	(Canada) Peter Polansky	(Canada) Milan Pokrajac (United States) Eric Quigley	(Hungary) Márton Fucsovics (Croatia) Ante Pavić (Mexico) Daniel Garza (United States) Chase Buchanan
September 17	Canada F9 Futures; Markham, Canada; Hard (indoor) $15,000	(United States) Chase Buchanan (United States) Tennys Sandgren; 6–2, 4–6, [10–7]	(Australia) Carsten Ball (Canada) Peter Polansky	(Canada) Milan Pokrajac (United States) Eric Quigley	(Hungary) Márton Fucsovics (Croatia) Ante Pavić (Mexico) Daniel Garza (United States) Chase Buchanan
September 17	France F17 Futures; Plaisir, France; Hard (indoor) $15,000+H	(France) Marc Gicquel; 6–2, 6–3	(Switzerland) Sandro Ehrat	(Germany) Moritz Baumann (Russia) Alexey Vatutin	(France) Charles-Antoine Brézac (France) Élie Rousset (France) Julien Obry (Switzerland) Adrien Bossel
September 17	France F17 Futures; Plaisir, France; Hard (indoor) $15,000+H	(Switzerland) Adrien Bossel (France) Julien Obry; 7–6^{(7–3)}, 7–6^{(7–5)}	(France) Kevin Botti (France) Élie Rousset	(Germany) Moritz Baumann (Russia) Alexey Vatutin	(France) Charles-Antoine Brézac (France) Élie Rousset (France) Julien Obry (Switzerland) Adrien Bossel
September 17	Italy F27 Futures; Biella, Italy; Clay $10,000	(Spain) Marc Giner; 6–3, 7–5	(Italy) Daniele Giorgini	(Italy) Stefano Napolitano (Republic of Ireland) Sam Barry	(Colombia) Cristian Rodríguez (Italy) Viktor Galović (Italy) Andrea Arnaboldi (Italy) Davide Della Tommasina
September 17	Italy F27 Futures; Biella, Italy; Clay $10,000	(Italy) Enrico Fioravante (Colombia) Cristian Rodríguez; 6–3, 6–2	(Italy) Andrea Arnaboldi (Italy) Matteo Volante	(Italy) Stefano Napolitano (Republic of Ireland) Sam Barry	(Colombia) Cristian Rodríguez (Italy) Viktor Galović (Italy) Andrea Arnaboldi (Italy) Davide Della Tommasina
September 17	Kuwait F1 Futures; Meshref, Kuwait; Hard $10,000	(Italy) Alessandro Bega; 7–5, 6–4	(United States) Sean Berman	(Kuwait) Mohammed Ghareeb (France) Michael Bois	(France) Romain Sichez (Netherlands) Jeroen Benard (Italy) Luca Rovetta (Russia) Mikhail Vasiliev
September 17	Kuwait F1 Futures; Meshref, Kuwait; Hard $10,000	(Kuwait) Mohammed Ghareeb (Russia) Mikhail Vasiliev; 3–6, 7–6^{(7–5)}, [10–7]	(Italy) Alessandro Bega (Czech Republic) Jan Blecha	(Kuwait) Mohammed Ghareeb (France) Michael Bois	(France) Romain Sichez (Netherlands) Jeroen Benard (Italy) Luca Rovetta (Russia) Mikhail Vasiliev
September 17	Mexico F11 Futures; Manzanillo, Mexico; Hard $10,000	(Barbados) Darian King; 6–0, 6–1	(Japan) Yoshihito Nishioka	(Guatemala) Christopher Díaz Figueroa (Haiti) Olivier Sajous	(United States) Adam El Mihdawy (Colombia) Michael Quintero (Mexico) Miguel Gallardo Valles (Mexico) Luis Patiño
September 17	Mexico F11 Futures; Manzanillo, Mexico; Hard $10,000	(New Zealand) Marvin Barker (United States) Adam El Mihdawy; 6–3, 6–4	(Mexico) Mauricio Astorga (Mexico) Luis Patiño	(Guatemala) Christopher Díaz Figueroa (Haiti) Olivier Sajous	(United States) Adam El Mihdawy (Colombia) Michael Quintero (Mexico) Miguel Gallardo Valles (Mexico) Luis Patiño
September 17	Portugal F4 Futures; Espinho, Portugal; Clay $15,000	(Czech Republic) Jiří Veselý; 6–2, 6–4	(Switzerland) Henri Laaksonen	(Spain) Jordi Samper Montaña (Belgium) Arthur De Greef	(Italy) Matteo Marrai (Argentina) Renzo Olivo (Belgium) Yannik Reuter (Spain) Gerard Granollers Pujol
September 17	Portugal F4 Futures; Espinho, Portugal; Clay $15,000	(Netherlands) Stephan Fransen (Netherlands) Wesley Koolhof; 7–5, 6–2	(Switzerland) Henri Laaksonen (Switzerland) Fede Valsangiacomo	(Spain) Jordi Samper Montaña (Belgium) Arthur De Greef	(Italy) Matteo Marrai (Argentina) Renzo Olivo (Belgium) Yannik Reuter (Spain) Gerard Granollers Pujol
September 17	Serbia F13 Futures; Niš, Serbia; Clay $10,000	(Serbia) Miljan Zekić; 5–7, 6–1, 6–1	(Bulgaria) Tihomir Grozdanov	(France) Axel Michon (Slovakia) Jozef Kovalík	(France) Mathias Bourgue (Serbia) Peđa Krstin (Spain) Carlos Gómez-Herrera (Bosnia and Herzegovina) Aldin Šetkić
September 17	Serbia F13 Futures; Niš, Serbia; Clay $10,000	(Croatia) Duje Kekez (Croatia) Marko Mijačević; 6–3, 6–3	(Mexico) Javier Herrera-Eguiluz (Serbia) Ilija Vučić	(France) Axel Michon (Slovakia) Jozef Kovalík	(France) Mathias Bourgue (Serbia) Peđa Krstin (Spain) Carlos Gómez-Herrera (Bosnia and Herzegovina) Aldin Šetkić
September 17	Spain F29 Futures; Madrid, Spain; Hard $10,000	(Italy) Roberto Marcora; 6–3, 7–6^{(7–3)}	(Spain) Andrés Artuñedo	(Spain) David Pérez Sanz (Spain) Jaime Pulgar-García	(Spain) José Checa Calvo (Algeria) Lamine Ouahab (Spain) Ricardo Villacorta-Alonso (Japan) Ryota Kishi
September 17	Spain F29 Futures; Madrid, Spain; Hard $10,000	(Spain) Iván Arenas-Gualda (Spain) Jaime Pulgar-García; 6–4, 6–3	(Spain) Ricardo Ojeda Lara (Spain) Oriol Roca Batalla	(Spain) David Pérez Sanz (Spain) Jaime Pulgar-García	(Spain) José Checa Calvo (Algeria) Lamine Ouahab (Spain) Ricardo Villacorta-Alonso (Japan) Ryota Kishi
September 17	Sweden F5 Futures; Danderyd-Stockholm, Sweden; Hard (indoor) $10,000	(Sweden) Isak Arvidsson; 7–6^{(8–6)}, 6–3	(Finland) Timo Nieminen	(Sweden) Lucas Renard (Sweden) Ervin Eleskovic	(Sweden) Pablo Figueroa (France) Hugo Nys (France) Émilien Firmin (Sweden) Daniel Berta
September 17	Sweden F5 Futures; Danderyd-Stockholm, Sweden; Hard (indoor) $10,000	(Sweden) Ervin Eleskovic (Sweden) Pablo Figueroa; 6–3, 6–2	(Sweden) Jesper Brunström (Sweden) Viktor Stjern	(Sweden) Lucas Renard (Sweden) Ervin Eleskovic	(Sweden) Pablo Figueroa (France) Hugo Nys (France) Émilien Firmin (Sweden) Daniel Berta
September 17	Turkey F36 Futures; Antalya-Belconti, Turkey; Hard $10,000	(Zimbabwe) Takanyi Garanganga; 3–6, 6–2, 6–2	(Russia) Andrei Plotniy	(Germany) Peter Heller (Italy) Andrea Patracchini	(Canada) Antoine Richard (Ukraine) Vadim Alekseenko (Slovakia) Adrian Partl (Moldova) Andrei Ciumac
September 17	Turkey F36 Futures; Antalya-Belconti, Turkey; Hard $10,000	(Russia) Kirill Dmitriev (Switzerland) Luca Margaroli; 3–6, 7–6^{(7–1)}, [10–8]	(Czech Republic) Jakub Hadrava (Czech Republic) Ondřej Vaculík	(Germany) Peter Heller (Italy) Andrea Patracchini	(Canada) Antoine Richard (Ukraine) Vadim Alekseenko (Slovakia) Adrian Partl (Moldova) Andrei Ciumac
September 17	USA F25 Futures; Costa Mesa, United States; Hard $10,000	(United States) Daniel Kosakowski; 6–4, 7–5	(United States) Jeff Dadamo	(United States) Dennis Nevolo (United States) Devin Britton	(United States) Jason Jung (United States) Marcos Giron (United States) Dennis Lajola (United States) Daniel Nguyen
September 17	USA F25 Futures; Costa Mesa, United States; Hard $10,000	(United States) Nicolas Meister (United States) Ryan Thacher; 4–6, 7–6^{(8–6)}, [10–7]	(United States) Devin Britton (United States) Jeff Dadamo	(United States) Dennis Nevolo (United States) Devin Britton	(United States) Jason Jung (United States) Marcos Giron (United States) Dennis Lajola (United States) Daniel Nguyen
September 17	Vietnam F5 Futures; Bình Dương, Vietnam; Hard $10,000	(India) Vijayant Malik; 7–5, 6–2	(Japan) Junn Mitsuhashi	(Chinese Taipei) Huang Liang-chi (China) Gong Maoxin	(New Zealand) José Statham (South Korea) Jeong Suk-young (China) Li Zhe (Thailand) Kittiphong Wachiramanowong
September 17	Vietnam F5 Futures; Bình Dương, Vietnam; Hard $10,000	(Thailand) Weerapat Doakmaiklee (New Zealand) José Statham; 6–1, 6–0	(Chinese Taipei) Huang Liang-chi (China) Ouyang Bowen	(Chinese Taipei) Huang Liang-chi (China) Gong Maoxin	(New Zealand) José Statham (South Korea) Jeong Suk-young (China) Li Zhe (Thailand) Kittiphong Wachiramanowong
September 24	Bolivia F3 Futures; La Paz, Bolivia; Clay $10,000	(Argentina) José María Páez; 7–6^{(7–5)}, 6–4	(Bolivia) Mauricio Doria-Medina	(Japan) Ryusei Makiguchi (Peru) Sergio Galdós	(Argentina) Valentín Florez (Argentina) Federico Coria (Bolivia) Hugo Dellien (Peru) Mauricio Echazú
September 24	Bolivia F3 Futures; La Paz, Bolivia; Clay $10,000	(Argentina) Facundo Mena (Peru) Rodrigo Sánchez; 7–6^{(7–5)}, 7–6^{(8–6)}	(Guatemala) Christopher Díaz Figueroa (Colombia) Sebastián Serrano	(Japan) Ryusei Makiguchi (Peru) Sergio Galdós	(Argentina) Valentín Florez (Argentina) Federico Coria (Bolivia) Hugo Dellien (Peru) Mauricio Echazú
September 24	Brazil F27 Futures; Belém, Brazil; Hard $15,000+H	(Argentina) Agustín Velotti; 3–6, 6–2, 6–3	(Brazil) Fabiano de Paula	(Brazil) José Pereira (Brazil) André Ghem	(Brazil) Fabrício Neis (Brazil) João Pedro Sorgi (Chile) Jorge Aguilar (Brazil) Augusto Laranja
September 24	Brazil F27 Futures; Belém, Brazil; Hard $15,000+H	(Brazil) Guilherme Clezar (Brazil) Fabrício Neis; 6–0, 7–6^{(8–6)}	(Brazil) Nicolas Santos (Brazil) João Pedro Sorgi	(Brazil) José Pereira (Brazil) André Ghem	(Brazil) Fabrício Neis (Brazil) João Pedro Sorgi (Chile) Jorge Aguilar (Brazil) Augusto Laranja
September 24	Colombia F3 Futures; Cúcuta, Colombia; Clay $15,000	(Colombia) Alejandro González; 7–5, 6–2	(Colombia) Michael Quintero	(Argentina) Patricio Heras (Colombia) Nicolás Barrientos	(United States) Christopher Racz (Brazil) Marcelo Demoliner (Australia) Chris Letcher (Chile) Guillermo Hormazábal
September 24	Colombia F3 Futures; Cúcuta, Colombia; Clay $15,000	(Brazil) Marcelo Demoliner (Chile) Guillermo Hormazábal; 6–4, 3–6, [10–4]	(Philippines) Ruben Gonzales (Australia) Chris Letcher	(Argentina) Patricio Heras (Colombia) Nicolás Barrientos	(United States) Christopher Racz (Brazil) Marcelo Demoliner (Australia) Chris Letcher (Chile) Guillermo Hormazábal
September 24	France F18 Futures; Sarreguemines, France; Carpet (indoor) $10,000	(Germany) Tim Pütz; 7–5, 6–2	(France) Élie Rousset	(France) Julien Obry (France) Antoine Benneteau	(France) Alexandre Penaud (Germany) Sami Reinwein (France) Hugo Schott (France) Maxime Forcin
September 24	France F18 Futures; Sarreguemines, France; Carpet (indoor) $10,000	(France) Julien Obry (France) Alexandre Penaud; 2–6, 6–1, [10–8]	(South Africa) Jean Andersen (France) Hugo Nys	(France) Julien Obry (France) Antoine Benneteau	(France) Alexandre Penaud (Germany) Sami Reinwein (France) Hugo Schott (France) Maxime Forcin
September 24	Germany F17 Futures; Hambach, Germany; Carpet (indoor) $10,000	(United Kingdom) Neil Pauffley; 6–4, 6–4	(Germany) Stefan Seifert	(Germany) David Thurner (Italy) Erik Crepaldi	(Switzerland) Alexander Sadecky (Germany) Christoph Negritu (Germany) Maximilian Marterer (Germany) Matthias Wunner
September 24	Germany F17 Futures; Hambach, Germany; Carpet (indoor) $10,000	(Serbia) Nikola Ćaćić (Slovakia) Adrian Sikora; 6–2, 6–3	(Germany) Pirmin Hänle (New Zealand) Matt Simpson	(Germany) David Thurner (Italy) Erik Crepaldi	(Switzerland) Alexander Sadecky (Germany) Christoph Negritu (Germany) Maximilian Marterer (Germany) Matthias Wunner
September 24	Italy F28 Futures; Pozzuoli, Italy; Hard $10,000	(Italy) Riccardo Bellotti; 6–7^{(8–10)}, 6–1, 7–5	(Colombia) Cristian Rodríguez	(Republic of Ireland) Sam Barry (Czech Republic) Jakub Lustyk	(Italy) Claudio Grassi (Italy) Stefano Napolitano (Italy) Marco Bortolotti (Italy) Giammarco Micolani
September 24	Italy F28 Futures; Pozzuoli, Italy; Hard $10,000	(Italy) Enrico Fioravante (Italy) Matteo Volante; 6–4, 6–2	(Republic of Ireland) Sam Barry (Colombia) Cristian Rodríguez	(Republic of Ireland) Sam Barry (Czech Republic) Jakub Lustyk	(Italy) Claudio Grassi (Italy) Stefano Napolitano (Italy) Marco Bortolotti (Italy) Giammarco Micolani
September 24	Kuwait F2 Futures; Meshref, Kuwait; Hard $10,000	(Kuwait) Mohammed Ghareeb; 5–7, 7–6^{(8–6)}, 6–2	(Chinese Taipei) Chen Ti	(South Africa) Ruan Roelofse (France) Romain Sichez	(France) Laurent Malouli (Kuwait) Abdullah Maqdes (France) Clément Reix (India) Prajnesh Gunneswaran
September 24	Kuwait F2 Futures; Meshref, Kuwait; Hard $10,000	(Kuwait) Abdullah Maqdes (South Africa) Ruan Roelofse; 6–4, 6–4	(France) Clément Reix (France) Romain Sichez	(South Africa) Ruan Roelofse (France) Romain Sichez	(France) Laurent Malouli (Kuwait) Abdullah Maqdes (France) Clément Reix (India) Prajnesh Gunneswaran
September 24	Portugal F5 Futures; Porto, Portugal; Clay $15,000	(Spain) Marc Giner; 7–6^{(8–6)}, 6–2	(Switzerland) Henri Laaksonen	(France) Florian Reynet (Germany) Steven Moneke	(Czech Republic) Dušan Lojda (Venezuela) David Souto (Czech Republic) Jiří Veselý (Spain) Marc García-Román
September 24	Portugal F5 Futures; Porto, Portugal; Clay $15,000	(Portugal) João Domingues (Portugal) Gonçalo Loureiro; 3–6, 6–1, [10–8]	(Germany) Steven Moneke (Germany) Marc Sieber	(France) Florian Reynet (Germany) Steven Moneke	(Czech Republic) Dušan Lojda (Venezuela) David Souto (Czech Republic) Jiří Veselý (Spain) Marc García-Román
September 24	Serbia F14 Futures; Sokobanja, Serbia; Clay $10,000	(Slovakia) Jozef Kovalík; 6–3, 5–7, 6–4	(France) Lucas Pouille	(Bosnia and Herzegovina) Aldin Šetkić (Serbia) Ivan Bjelica	(France) Mathias Bourgue (Bosnia and Herzegovina) Ismar Gorčić (Serbia) Peđa Krstin (Slovakia) Filip Horanský
September 24	Serbia F14 Futures; Sokobanja, Serbia; Clay $10,000	(Serbia) Ivan Bjelica (Bosnia and Herzegovina) Aldin Šetkić; 6–2, 6–0	(North Macedonia) Shendrit Deari (North Macedonia) Tomislav Jotovski	(Bosnia and Herzegovina) Aldin Šetkić (Serbia) Ivan Bjelica	(France) Mathias Bourgue (Bosnia and Herzegovina) Ismar Gorčić (Serbia) Peđa Krstin (Slovakia) Filip Horanský
September 24	Spain F30 Futures; Sevilla, Spain; Clay $15,000	(Spain) Gerard Granollers Pujol; 6–0, 4–6, 6–1	(Australia) Jason Kubler	(Italy) Andrea Arnaboldi (Spain) Roberto Carballés Baena	(Italy) Filippo Leonardi (Egypt) Mohamed Safwat (Spain) Jordi Samper Montaña (Spain) Carlos Gómez-Herrera
September 24	Spain F30 Futures; Sevilla, Spain; Clay $15,000	(Spain) Gerard Granollers Pujol (Spain) Jordi Samper Montaña; 6–4, 6–0	(Spain) Jordi Marse-Vidri (Spain) Carles Poch Gradin	(Italy) Andrea Arnaboldi (Spain) Roberto Carballés Baena	(Italy) Filippo Leonardi (Egypt) Mohamed Safwat (Spain) Jordi Samper Montaña (Spain) Carlos Gómez-Herrera
September 24	Sweden F6 Futures; Falun, Sweden; Hard (indoor) $10,000	(United Kingdom) Daniel Smethurst; 4–6, 6–0, 6–1	(United Kingdom) Joshua Milton	(Sweden) Pablo Figueroa (United Kingdom) Tom Burn	(Sweden) Milos Sekulic (Finland) Timo Nieminen (Sweden) Lucas Renard (Sweden) Magnus Ohrvall
September 24	Sweden F6 Futures; Falun, Sweden; Hard (indoor) $10,000	(Sweden) Jesper Brunström (Sweden) Markus Eriksson; 6–4, 7–5	(Sweden) Filip Bergevi (Sweden) Fred Simonsson	(Sweden) Pablo Figueroa (United Kingdom) Tom Burn	(Sweden) Milos Sekulic (Finland) Timo Nieminen (Sweden) Lucas Renard (Sweden) Magnus Ohrvall
September 24	Turkey F37 Futures; Antalya-Kaya Belek, Turkey; Hard $10,000	(Czech Republic) Adam Pavlásek; 6–1, 6–3	(Moldova) Andrei Ciumac	(Australia) Dane Propoggia (New Zealand) Artem Sitak	(Australia) Brydan Klein (Belarus) Dzmitry Zhyrmont (Germany) Peter Heller (Italy) Edoardo Eremin
September 24	Turkey F37 Futures; Antalya-Kaya Belek, Turkey; Hard $10,000	(Australia) Brydan Klein (Australia) Dane Propoggia; 6–1, 6–2	(Italy) Matteo Donati (Italy) Francesco Picco	(Australia) Dane Propoggia (New Zealand) Artem Sitak	(Australia) Brydan Klein (Belarus) Dzmitry Zhyrmont (Germany) Peter Heller (Italy) Edoardo Eremin
September 24	USA F26 Futures; Irvine, United States; Hard $10,000	(United States) Daniel Nguyen; 7–5, 6–2	(United Kingdom) Alex Bogdanovic	(India) Prakash Amritraj (United States) Chris Wettengel	(United States) Mitchell Krueger (United States) Dennis Lajola (United States) Connor Farren (United States) Austin Krajicek
September 24	USA F26 Futures; Irvine, United States; Hard $10,000	(United States) Devin Britton (United States) Austin Krajicek; 6–2 Ret.	(United States) Marcos Giron (United States) Dennis Novikov	(India) Prakash Amritraj (United States) Chris Wettengel	(United States) Mitchell Krueger (United States) Dennis Lajola (United States) Connor Farren (United States) Austin Krajicek
September 24	Vietnam F6 Futures; Bình Dương, Vietnam; Hard $10,000	(China) Gong Maoxin; 6–2, 7–6^{(7–5)}	(Chinese Taipei) Huang Liang-chi	(China) Li Zhe (Japan) Shuichi Sekiguchi	(South Korea) Na Jung-woong (Japan) Junn Mitsuhashi (India) Vijayant Malik (United Kingdom) Andrew Fitzpatrick
September 24	Vietnam F6 Futures; Bình Dương, Vietnam; Hard $10,000	(Chinese Taipei) Huang Liang-chi (China) Ouyang Bowen; 6–3, 2–6, [10–7]	(Japan) Arata Onozawa (Japan) Shuichi Sekiguchi	(China) Li Zhe (Japan) Shuichi Sekiguchi	(South Korea) Na Jung-woong (Japan) Junn Mitsuhashi (India) Vijayant Malik (United Kingdom) Andrew Fitzpatrick
