= 2012 ITF Men's Circuit (April–June) =

The 2012 ITF Men's Circuit is the 2012 edition of the entry level tour for men's professional tennis, and is the third tier tennis tour below the Association of Tennis Professionals, World Tour and Challenger Tour. It is organised by the International Tennis Federation (ITF) who additionally organizes the ITF Women's Circuit which is an entry-level tour for women's professional tennis. Future tournaments are organized to offer either $10,000 or $15,000 in prize money and tournaments which offering hospitality to players competing in the main draw give additional ranking points which are valid under the ATP ranking system, and are to be organized by a national association or approved by the ITF Men's Circuit Committee.

The tournaments are played on a rectangular flat surface, commonly referred to as a tennis court. The dimensions of a tennis court are defined and regulated by the ITF and the court is 23.78 meters (78.0 feet) long, 10.97 meters (36.0 feet) wide. Its width is 8.23 meters (27.0 feet) for singles matches and 10.97 meters (36.0 feet) for doubles matches. Tennis is played on a variety of surfaces and each surface has its own characteristics which affect the playing style of the game. There are four main types of courts depending on the materials used for the court surface, clay, hard, grass and carpet courts with the ITF classifying five different pace settings ranging from slow to fast.

== Point distribution ==
Tournament category	W	F	SF	QF	R16	R32
Futures 15,000+H	35	20	10	4	1	0
Futures 15,000	27	15	8	3	1	0
Futures 10,000+H	27	15	8	3	1	0
Futures 10,000	18	10	6	2	1	0

== Key ==
$15,000 tournaments
$10,000 tournaments

== Month ==
=== April ===
Week of	Tournament	Winner	Runners-up	Semifinalists	Quarterfinalists
April 2	Argentina F6 Futures; Villa María, Argentina; Clay $10,000	(Argentina) Pablo Galdón; 6–4, 6–3	(United States) Andrea Collarini	(Argentina) Juan-Martín Aranguren (Argentina) Nicolás Pastor	(Brazil) José Pereira (Argentina) Joaquín-Jesús Monteferrario (Argentina) Mateo Nicolás Martínez (Argentina) Juan-Pablo Amado
April 2	Argentina F6 Futures; Villa María, Argentina; Clay $10,000	(Peru) Sergio Galdós (Argentina) Renzo Olivo; 1–6, 6–4, [10–4]	(Argentina) Tomás Lipovšek Puches (Argentina) Juan Pablo Ortiz	(Argentina) Juan-Martín Aranguren (Argentina) Nicolás Pastor	(Brazil) José Pereira (Argentina) Joaquín-Jesús Monteferrario (Argentina) Mateo Nicolás Martínez (Argentina) Juan-Pablo Amado
April 2	Croatia F6 Futures; Vrsar, Croatia; Clay $10,000	(Germany) Marcel Zimmermann; 7–6^{(7–5)}, 4–6, 6–2	(Germany) Steven Moneke	(Germany) Bastian Knittel (Croatia) Joško Topić	(Japan) Taro Daniel (Germany) Marc Sieber (Croatia) Marin Bradarić (Russia) Aleksandr Lobkov
April 2	Croatia F6 Futures; Vrsar, Croatia; Clay $10,000	(Austria) Lukas Jastraunig (Austria) Tristan-Samuel Weissborn; 6–4, 4–6, [10–8]	(Croatia) Krešimir Ritz (Croatia) Joško Topić	(Germany) Bastian Knittel (Croatia) Joško Topić	(Japan) Taro Daniel (Germany) Marc Sieber (Croatia) Marin Bradarić (Russia) Aleksandr Lobkov
April 2	Greece F1 Futures; Heraklion, Greece; Carpet $10,000	(France) Yannick Jankovits; 6–3, 7–5	(Belgium) Niels Desein	(Greece) Alexandros Jakupovic (Serbia) Danilo Petrović	(United Kingdom) Oliver Hudson (Germany) Peter Heller (Germany) Dieter Kindlmann (Sweden) Patrik Rosenholm
April 2	Greece F1 Futures; Heraklion, Greece; Carpet $10,000	(Austria) Björn Propst (Austria) Bastian Trinker; 6–1, 6–3	(Greece) Markos Kalovelonis (Greece) Charalampos Kapogiannis	(Greece) Alexandros Jakupovic (Serbia) Danilo Petrović	(United Kingdom) Oliver Hudson (Germany) Peter Heller (Germany) Dieter Kindlmann (Sweden) Patrik Rosenholm
April 2	Italy F3 Futures; Rome, Italy; Clay $15,000	(Italy) Daniele Giorgini; 7–5, 6–2	(United Kingdom) Morgan Phillips	(Netherlands) Nick van der Meer (Italy) Luca Vanni	(Italy) Marco Cecchinato (Italy) Claudio Grassi (France) Jonathan Eysseric (Italy) Giulio Torroni
April 2	Italy F3 Futures; Rome, Italy; Clay $15,000	(France) Jonathan Eysseric (Chile) Hans Podlipnik Castillo; 4–6, 6–4, [10–4]	(Brazil) Daniel Dutra da Silva (Brazil) Pedro Sakamoto	(Netherlands) Nick van der Meer (Italy) Luca Vanni	(Italy) Marco Cecchinato (Italy) Claudio Grassi (France) Jonathan Eysseric (Italy) Giulio Torroni
April 2	Japan F4 Futures; Tsukuba, Japan; Hard $10,000	(Japan) Yasutaka Uchiyama; 7–5, 6–4	(Chinese Taipei) Huang Liang-chi	(Australia) Luke Saville (Japan) Toshihide Matsui	(China) Gao Peng (Japan) Takuto Niki (South Korea) Daniel Yoo (China) Chang Yu
April 2	Japan F4 Futures; Tsukuba, Japan; Hard $10,000	(Chinese Taipei) Huang Liang-chi (Chinese Taipei) Peng Hsien-yin; 6–3, 6–4	(Japan) Shota Tagawa (Japan) Yasutaka Uchiyama	(Australia) Luke Saville (Japan) Toshihide Matsui	(China) Gao Peng (Japan) Takuto Niki (South Korea) Daniel Yoo (China) Chang Yu
April 2	Kazakhstan F2 Futures; Astana, Kazakhstan; Hard (indoor) $10,000	(Russia) Alexey Vatutin; 7–6^{(7–1)}, 6–2	(Belarus) Egor Gerasimov	(Belarus) Siarhei Betau (India) Karan Rastogi	(Kazakhstan) Denis Yevseyev (Italy) Francesco Garzelli (Russia) Mikhail Biryukov (Belarus) Egor Puntus
April 2	Kazakhstan F2 Futures; Astana, Kazakhstan; Hard (indoor) $10,000	(Russia) Mikhail Fufygin (Russia) Andrei Levine; 6–7^{(3–7)}, 7–5, [14–12]	(Belarus) Siarhei Betau (Belarus) Andrei Vasilevski	(Belarus) Siarhei Betau (India) Karan Rastogi	(Kazakhstan) Denis Yevseyev (Italy) Francesco Garzelli (Russia) Mikhail Biryukov (Belarus) Egor Puntus
April 2	Saudi Arabia F1 Futures; Riyadh, Saudi Arabia; Hard $10,000	(France) Jules Marie; 6–1, 7–6^{(9–7)}	(France) Antoine Escoffier	(Spain) Jordi Samper Montaña (Kuwait) Abdullah Maqdes	(United Kingdom) Joshua Jones (France) Matthieu Roy (United Kingdom) Matthew Short (Spain) Enrique López Pérez
April 2	Saudi Arabia F1 Futures; Riyadh, Saudi Arabia; Hard $10,000	(Australia) Zach Itzstein (India) Ashwin Vijayragavan; 7–5, 7–5	(United Kingdom) Joshua Jones (United Kingdom) Matthew Short	(Spain) Jordi Samper Montaña (Kuwait) Abdullah Maqdes	(United Kingdom) Joshua Jones (France) Matthieu Roy (United Kingdom) Matthew Short (Spain) Enrique López Pérez
April 2	Turkey F13 Futures; Antalya-Belconti, Turkey; Hard $10,000	(Ukraine) Oleksandr Nedovyesov; 6–4, 6–7^{(6–8)}, 6–3	(Slovakia) Adrian Sikora	(Bosnia and Herzegovina) Ismar Gorčić (Italy) Federico Gaio	(France) François-Arthur Vibert (Austria) Richard Ruckelshausen (Ukraine) Ivan Sergeyev (Spain) Guillermo Gómez-Díaz
April 2	Turkey F13 Futures; Antalya-Belconti, Turkey; Hard $10,000	(Sweden) Milos Sekulic (Sweden) Igor Tubic; 6–3, 6–4	(Germany) Marvin Netuschil (Germany) Matthias Wunner	(Bosnia and Herzegovina) Ismar Gorčić (Italy) Federico Gaio	(France) François-Arthur Vibert (Austria) Richard Ruckelshausen (Ukraine) Ivan Sergeyev (Spain) Guillermo Gómez-Díaz
April 2	Vietnam F1 Futures; Ho Chi Minh City, Vietnam; Hard $10,000	(New Zealand) José Statham; 5–2, retired	(Australia) Nick Lindahl	(United Kingdom) Jack Carpenter (Austria) Daniel Geib	(Japan) Kento Takeuchi (Australia) Dane Propoggia (Germany) Robin Kern (Canada) Kelsey Stevenson
April 2	Vietnam F1 Futures; Ho Chi Minh City, Vietnam; Hard $10,000	(India) Sriram Balaji (India) Rohan Gajjar; 6–3, 6–4	(Australia) Dane Propoggia (New Zealand) José Statham	(United Kingdom) Jack Carpenter (Austria) Daniel Geib	(Japan) Kento Takeuchi (Australia) Dane Propoggia (Germany) Robin Kern (Canada) Kelsey Stevenson
April 9	China F5 Futures; Chengdu, China; Hard $15,000	(China) Zhang Ze; 7–6^{(7–3)}, 6–3	(China) Wu Di	(China) Chang Yu (China) Li Zhe	(Japan) Toshihide Matsui (United Kingdom) Joshua Milton (Japan) Arata Onozawa (South Korea) Daniel Yoo
April 9	China F5 Futures; Chengdu, China; Hard $15,000	(China) Gao Peng (China) Gao Wan; 6–4, 6–4	(Japan) Toshihide Matsui (Japan) Yusuke Watanuki	(China) Chang Yu (China) Li Zhe	(Japan) Toshihide Matsui (United Kingdom) Joshua Milton (Japan) Arata Onozawa (South Korea) Daniel Yoo
April 9	Chinese Taipei F1 Futures; Kaohsiung, Chinese Taipei; Hard $15,000	(Thailand) Danai Udomchoke; 6–4, 6–4	(New Zealand) Daniel King-Turner	(Chinese Taipei) Huang Liang-chi (Japan) Hiroki Moriya	(United Kingdom) James Ward (Chinese Taipei) Yi Chu-huan (South Korea) Kim Young-jun (France) Clement Reix
April 9	Chinese Taipei F1 Futures; Kaohsiung, Chinese Taipei; Hard $15,000	(Chinese Taipei) Hsieh Cheng-peng (Chinese Taipei) Lee Hsin-han; 5–7, 6–1, [10–8]	(Russia) Denis Matsukevich (Thailand) Danai Udomchoke	(Chinese Taipei) Huang Liang-chi (Japan) Hiroki Moriya	(United Kingdom) James Ward (Chinese Taipei) Yi Chu-huan (South Korea) Kim Young-jun (France) Clement Reix
April 9	France F7 Futures; Angers, France; Clay (indoor) $15,000+H	(France) Laurent Rochette; 2–6, 6–4, 6–4	(France) Nicolas Renavand	(France) Josselin Ouanna (France) Grégoire Burquier	(Serbia) Miljan Zekić (France) Jonathan Eysseric (France) Émilien Firmin (Czech Republic) Jiří Veselý
April 9	France F7 Futures; Angers, France; Clay (indoor) $15,000+H	(Romania) Andrei Dăescu (Romania) Florin Mergea; 6–2, 3–6, [10–7]	(France) Marc Gicquel (France) Nicolas Renavand	(France) Josselin Ouanna (France) Grégoire Burquier	(Serbia) Miljan Zekić (France) Jonathan Eysseric (France) Émilien Firmin (Czech Republic) Jiří Veselý
April 9	Greece F2 Futures; Heraklion, Greece; Carpet $10,000	(Greece) Alexandros Jakupovic; 6–7^{(9–11)}, 6–3, 6–4	(Belgium) Niels Desein	(Switzerland) Alexander Sadecky (France) Yannick Jankovits	(Austria) Bastian Trinker (Croatia) Mate Pavić (United Kingdom) Andrew Fitzpatrick (United Kingdom) Richard Bloomfield
April 9	Greece F2 Futures; Heraklion, Greece; Carpet $10,000	(France) Yannick Jankovits (Germany) George von Massow; 3–6, 7–6^{(7–5)}, [10–8]	(Greece) Paris Gemouchidis (Greece) Alexandros Jakupovic	(Switzerland) Alexander Sadecky (France) Yannick Jankovits	(Austria) Bastian Trinker (Croatia) Mate Pavić (United Kingdom) Andrew Fitzpatrick (United Kingdom) Richard Bloomfield
April 9	Italy F4 Futures; Vercelli, Italy; Clay $15,000	(Netherlands) Antal van der Duim; 6–3, 6–2	(Austria) Michael Linzer	(Spain) Carlos Gómez-Herrera (Italy) Claudio Grassi	(Germany) Kevin Krawietz (Italy) Erik Crepaldi (Germany) Nils Langer (United Kingdom) Daniel Smethurst
April 9	Italy F4 Futures; Vercelli, Italy; Clay $15,000	(Australia) Alex Bolt (Australia) Andrew Whittington; 6–3, 7–6^{(11–9)}	(Italy) Erik Crepaldi (Italy) Claudio Grassi	(Spain) Carlos Gómez-Herrera (Italy) Claudio Grassi	(Germany) Kevin Krawietz (Italy) Erik Crepaldi (Germany) Nils Langer (United Kingdom) Daniel Smethurst
April 9	Kazakhstan F3 Futures; Shymkent, Kazakhstan; Hard $10,000	(Kazakhstan) Alexey Kedryuk; 6–2, 7–6^{(8–6)}	(Belarus) Siarhei Betau	(Russia) Alexey Vatutin (Russia) Alexander Pavlioutchenkov	(India) Karan Rastogi (Russia) Mikhail Fufygin (Slovakia) Marko Daniš (Russia) Sergei Krotiouk
April 9	Kazakhstan F3 Futures; Shymkent, Kazakhstan; Hard $10,000	(Russia) Vitaliy Kachanovskiy (Russia) Alexander Pavlioutchenkov; 3–6, 6–4, [12–10]	(Russia) Mikhail Fufygin (Russia) Andrei Levine	(Russia) Alexey Vatutin (Russia) Alexander Pavlioutchenkov	(India) Karan Rastogi (Russia) Mikhail Fufygin (Slovakia) Marko Daniš (Russia) Sergei Krotiouk
April 9	Qatar F1 Futures; Doha, Qatar; Hard $10,000	(Kuwait) Abdullah Maqdes; 6–1, 2–6, 6–4	(France) Jules Marie	(Colombia) Cristian Rodríguez (Republic of Ireland) Sam Barry	(Spain) Jordi Samper Montaña (United Kingdom) Joshua Jones (France) François-Arthur Vibert (Spain) Enrique López Pérez
April 9	Qatar F1 Futures; Doha, Qatar; Hard $10,000	(Spain) Enrique López Pérez (Spain) Jordi Samper Montaña; 6–4, 7–5	(Russia) Alexei Filenkov (Ukraine) Denys Mylokostov	(Colombia) Cristian Rodríguez (Republic of Ireland) Sam Barry	(Spain) Jordi Samper Montaña (United Kingdom) Joshua Jones (France) François-Arthur Vibert (Spain) Enrique López Pérez
April 9	Turkey F14 Futures; Antalya-Belconti, Turkey; Hard $10,000	(Czech Republic) Jan Minář; 4–6, 7–6^{(7–5)}, 6–3	(Slovakia) Miloslav Mečíř	(Italy) Lorenzo Giustino (Italy) Federico Gaio	(Spain) Roberto Ortega Olmedo (Bulgaria) Todor Enev (Austria) Nikolaus Moser (Germany) Gero Kretschmer
April 9	Turkey F14 Futures; Antalya-Belconti, Turkey; Hard $10,000	(Germany) Richard Becker (Austria) Nikolaus Moser; 6–4, 6–1	(Germany) Gero Kretschmer (United Kingdom) Alexander Slabinsky	(Italy) Lorenzo Giustino (Italy) Federico Gaio	(Spain) Roberto Ortega Olmedo (Bulgaria) Todor Enev (Austria) Nikolaus Moser (Germany) Gero Kretschmer
April 9	USA F9 Futures (United States) Oklahoma City, United States; Hard $15,000	(United States) Greg Ouellette; 6–2, 6–1	(Brazil) Pedro Zerbini	(United States) Tennys Sandgren (Australia) Mark Verryth	(New Zealand) Marvin Barker (United Kingdom) Edward Corrie (United States) Daniel Stahl (United States) Harrison Adams
April 9	USA F9 Futures (United States) Oklahoma City, United States; Hard $15,000	(United Kingdom) Edward Corrie (United States) Vahid Mirzadeh; 6–1, 6–0	(United States) Harrison Adams (United States) Shane Vinsant	(United States) Tennys Sandgren (Australia) Mark Verryth	(New Zealand) Marvin Barker (United Kingdom) Edward Corrie (United States) Daniel Stahl (United States) Harrison Adams
April 9	Vietnam F2 Futures; Ho Chi Minh City, Vietnam; Hard (indoor) $10,000	(Japan) Shuichi Sekiguchi; 6–1, 6–3	(Austria) Daniel Geib	(Indonesia) Christopher Rungkat (France) Constantin Belot	(Thailand) Kittiphong Wachiramanowong (New Zealand) José Statham (Germany) Dominik Schulz (Japan) Hiromasa Oku
April 9	Vietnam F2 Futures; Ho Chi Minh City, Vietnam; Hard (indoor) $10,000	(Australia) Dane Propoggia (New Zealand) José Statham; 6–4, 6–1	(France) Constantin Belot (France) Kevin Botti	(Indonesia) Christopher Rungkat (France) Constantin Belot	(Thailand) Kittiphong Wachiramanowong (New Zealand) José Statham (Germany) Dominik Schulz (Japan) Hiromasa Oku
April 16	Argentina F7 Futures; Neuquén, Argentina; Clay $10,000	(Argentina) Juan Ignacio Londero; 6–3, 3–6, 6–4	(Argentina) Juan-Pablo Amado	(Chile) Cristóbal Saavedra Corvalán (Argentina) Federico Coria	(Brazil) Diego Matos (Argentina) Kevin Konfederak (Argentina) Nicolás Jara-Lozano (Argentina) Juan-Martín Aranguren
April 16	Argentina F7 Futures; Neuquén, Argentina; Clay $10,000	(Argentina) Juan-Pablo Amado (Brazil) Diego Matos; 6–2, 2–6, [10–7]	(Argentina) Juan Ignacio Amarante (Argentina) Juan Pablo Ortiz	(Chile) Cristóbal Saavedra Corvalán (Argentina) Federico Coria	(Brazil) Diego Matos (Argentina) Kevin Konfederak (Argentina) Nicolás Jara-Lozano (Argentina) Juan-Martín Aranguren
April 16	China F6 Futures; Chengdu, China; Hard $15,000	(China) Wu Di; 6–1, 7–6^{(8–6)}	(China) Zhang Ze	(Japan) Takuto Niki (Japan) Toshihide Matsui	(India) Vijayant Malik (United Kingdom) Joshua Milton (China) Li Zhe (China) Gong Maoxin
April 16	China F6 Futures; Chengdu, China; Hard $15,000	(China) Gao Xin (China) Li Zhe; 2–2 Ret.	(China) Chang Yu (China) Wu Di	(Japan) Takuto Niki (Japan) Toshihide Matsui	(India) Vijayant Malik (United Kingdom) Joshua Milton (China) Li Zhe (China) Gong Maoxin
April 16	Chinese Taipei F2 Futures; Kaohsiung, Chinese Taipei; Hard $15,000	(United Kingdom) James Ward; 7–5, 7–6^{(7–3)}	(Japan) Hiroki Moriya	(Australia) Matthew Barton (Chinese Taipei) Yang Tsung-hua	(Chinese Taipei) Jimmy Wang (Israel) Amir Weintraub (Australia) John Millman (Thailand) Danai Udomchoke
April 16	Chinese Taipei F2 Futures; Kaohsiung, Chinese Taipei; Hard $15,000	(Russia) Denis Matsukevich (Denmark) Frederik Nielsen; 6–4, 6–1	(South Korea) An Jae-sung (South Korea) Kim Young-jun	(Australia) Matthew Barton (Chinese Taipei) Yang Tsung-hua	(Chinese Taipei) Jimmy Wang (Israel) Amir Weintraub (Australia) John Millman (Thailand) Danai Udomchoke
April 16	France F8 Futures; Ajaccio, France; Clay $15,000+H	(France) Marc Gicquel; 6–3, 6–4	(France) Jonathan Dasnières de Veigy	(Belgium) Yannick Mertens (France) Simon Cauvard	(France) Élie Rousset (Czech Republic) Jiří Veselý (France) Olivier Patience (France) Romain Jouan
April 16	France F8 Futures; Ajaccio, France; Clay $15,000+H	(Germany) Alex Satschko (Germany) Jan-Lennard Struff; 0–6, 6–4, [10–7]	(France) Romain Jouan (Belgium) Yannick Mertens	(Belgium) Yannick Mertens (France) Simon Cauvard	(France) Élie Rousset (Czech Republic) Jiří Veselý (France) Olivier Patience (France) Romain Jouan
April 16	Greece F3 Futures; Heraklion, Greece; Carpet $10,000	(United Kingdom) Josh Goodall; 6–3, 6–0	(Germany) Dieter Kindlmann	(France) Gleb Sakharov (Sweden) Patrik Rosenholm	(Switzerland) Alexander Sadecky (United Kingdom) Andrew Fitzpatrick (Greece) Paris Gemouchidis (Germany) Dennis Blömke
April 16	Greece F3 Futures; Heraklion, Greece; Carpet $10,000	(Austria) Maximilian Neuchrist (Croatia) Mate Pavić; 7–6^{(7–3)}, 7–6^{(7–2)}	(Italy) Erik Crepaldi (Chile) Laslo Urrutia Fuentes	(France) Gleb Sakharov (Sweden) Patrik Rosenholm	(Switzerland) Alexander Sadecky (United Kingdom) Andrew Fitzpatrick (Greece) Paris Gemouchidis (Germany) Dennis Blömke
April 16	India F4 Futures; Tiruchirappalli, India; Hard $10,000	(Croatia) Marin Bradarić; 4–6, 6–3, 7–6^{(7–3)}	(Serbia) Arsenije Zlatanovic	(Belgium) Yannick Vandenbulcke (India) Ashwin Vijayragavan	(Italy) Lorenzo Frigerio (India) Sriram Balaji (India) Jeevan Nedunchezhiyan (India) Vijay Sundar Prashanth
April 16	India F4 Futures; Tiruchirappalli, India; Hard $10,000	(India) Jeevan Nedunchezhiyan (India) Vijay Sundar Prashanth; 7–6^{(7–3)}, 6–7^{(5–7)}, [10–7]	(India) Rupesh Roy (India) Vivek Shokeen	(Belgium) Yannick Vandenbulcke (India) Ashwin Vijayragavan	(Italy) Lorenzo Frigerio (India) Sriram Balaji (India) Jeevan Nedunchezhiyan (India) Vijay Sundar Prashanth
April 16	Italy F5 Futures; Padova, Italy; Clay $15,000	(Germany) Bastian Knittel; 6–3, 6–3	(Austria) Philipp Oswald	(Czech Republic) Marek Michalička (Serbia) Boris Pašanski	(United Kingdom) Daniel Smethurst (Netherlands) Boy Westerhof (Italy) Claudio Fortuna (Australia) Alex Bolt
April 16	Italy F5 Futures; Padova, Italy; Clay $15,000	(Germany) Bastian Knittel (Italy) Matteo Volante; 6–3, 6–0	(Italy) Claudio Grassi (Netherlands) Antal van der Duim	(Czech Republic) Marek Michalička (Serbia) Boris Pašanski	(United Kingdom) Daniel Smethurst (Netherlands) Boy Westerhof (Italy) Claudio Fortuna (Australia) Alex Bolt
April 16	Mexico F3 Futures; Córdoba, Mexico; Hard $15,000	(United Kingdom) Jamie Baker; 6–3, 6–2	(United States) Adam El Mihdawy	(United States) Denis Zivkovic (Mexico) César Ramírez	(Slovakia) Andrej Martin (Mexico) Miguel Gallardo Valles (Mexico) Mauricio Astorga (Guatemala) Christopher Díaz Figueroa
April 16	Mexico F3 Futures; Córdoba, Mexico; Hard $15,000	(Mexico) Luis Díaz Barriga (Australia) Chris Letcher; 6–2, 7–6^{(7–3)}	(Italy) Riccardo Ghedin (United States) Denis Zivkovic	(United States) Denis Zivkovic (Mexico) César Ramírez	(Slovakia) Andrej Martin (Mexico) Miguel Gallardo Valles (Mexico) Mauricio Astorga (Guatemala) Christopher Díaz Figueroa
April 16	Spain F8 Futures; Les Franqueses del Vallès, Spain; Hard $10,000	(France) Jérôme Inzerillo; 7–6^{(7–5)}, 6–4	(Russia) Aleksandr Lobkov	(Spain) Miguel Ángel López Jaén (Colombia) Juan Sebastián Gómez	(France) Mathieu Rodrigues (Russia) Stanislav Vovk (Italy) Lorenzo Giustino (Egypt) Mohamed Safwat
April 16	Spain F8 Futures; Les Franqueses del Vallès, Spain; Hard $10,000	(Spain) Iván Arenas-Gualda (Spain) Enrique López Pérez; 7–6^{(7–3)}, 6–4	(Spain) Guillermo Gómez-Díaz (Spain) Andoni Vivanco-Guzmán	(Spain) Miguel Ángel López Jaén (Colombia) Juan Sebastián Gómez	(France) Mathieu Rodrigues (Russia) Stanislav Vovk (Italy) Lorenzo Giustino (Egypt) Mohamed Safwat
April 16	Turkey F15 Futures; Antalya-Belconti, Turkey; Hard $10,000	(Moldova) Radu Albot; 6–1, 4–6, 6–2	(Bosnia and Herzegovina) Tomislav Brkić	(Australia) Brydan Klein (Slovakia) Miloslav Mečíř	(Poland) Adam Chadaj (France) Sébastien Boltz (Germany) Gero Kretschmer (Belgium) Joris De Loore
April 16	Turkey F15 Futures; Antalya-Belconti, Turkey; Hard $10,000	(New Zealand) Marcus Daniell (Germany) Gero Kretschmer; 6–0, 6–2	(Bosnia and Herzegovina) Tomislav Brkić (Croatia) Mislav Hižak	(Australia) Brydan Klein (Slovakia) Miloslav Mečíř	(Poland) Adam Chadaj (France) Sébastien Boltz (Germany) Gero Kretschmer (Belgium) Joris De Loore
April 16	USA F10 Futures (United States) Little Rock, United States; Hard $15,000	(United States) Tennys Sandgren; 6–1, 7–6^{(8–6)}	(Australia) John Peers	(Australia) John-Patrick Smith (United States) Dennis Lajola	(United States) Christian Harrison (United States) Chris Wettengel (United States) Greg Ouellette (United States) Reid Carleton
April 16	USA F10 Futures (United States) Little Rock, United States; Hard $15,000	(United States) Greg Ouellette (United States) Tennys Sandgren; 4–6, 7–6^{(7–2)}, [10–8]	(New Zealand) Marvin Barker (United Kingdom) Edward Corrie	(Australia) John-Patrick Smith (United States) Dennis Lajola	(United States) Christian Harrison (United States) Chris Wettengel (United States) Greg Ouellette (United States) Reid Carleton
April 16	Uzbekistan F1 Futures; Namangan, Uzbekistan; Hard $15,000	(Ukraine) Ivan Sergeyev; 7–6^{(7–5)}, 6–1	(Belarus) Uladzimir Ignatik	(Russia) Nikoloz Basilashvili (Russia) Alexey Vatutin	(Croatia) Filip Veger (Russia) Vitali Reshetnikov (Uzbekistan) Sarvar Ikramov (India) Karan Rastogi
April 16	Uzbekistan F1 Futures; Namangan, Uzbekistan; Hard $15,000	(Ukraine) Vladyslav Manafov (Belarus) Yaraslav Shyla; 6–3, 4–6, [10–4]	(Russia) Fedor Chervyakov (Kyrgyzstan) Daniiar Duldaev	(Russia) Nikoloz Basilashvili (Russia) Alexey Vatutin	(Croatia) Filip Veger (Russia) Vitali Reshetnikov (Uzbekistan) Sarvar Ikramov (India) Karan Rastogi
April 16	Vietnam F3 Futures; Ho Chi Minh City, Vietnam; Hard $10,000	(Chinese Taipei) Chen Ti; 7–5, 6–2	(France) Kevin Botti	(Japan) Kento Takeuchi (New Zealand) José Statham	(Vietnam) Nguyễn Hoàng Thiên (Japan) Hiromasa Oku (Australia) Nick Lindahl (Indonesia) Christopher Rungkat
April 16	Vietnam F3 Futures; Ho Chi Minh City, Vietnam; Hard $10,000	(Thailand) Weerapat Doakmaiklee (Thailand) Kittiphong Wachiramanowong; 6–4, 6–2	(Germany) Dominik Schulz (Germany) Maximilian Wilde	(Japan) Kento Takeuchi (New Zealand) José Statham	(Vietnam) Nguyễn Hoàng Thiên (Japan) Hiromasa Oku (Australia) Nick Lindahl (Indonesia) Christopher Rungkat
April 23	Argentina F8 Futures; Neuquén, Argentina; Clay $10,000	(Argentina) Federico Coria; 4–6, 6–1, 7–6^{(8–6)}	(Peru) Sergio Galdós	(Argentina) Maximiliano Estévez (Argentina) Facundo Mena	(Argentina) Juan Pablo Ortiz (Argentina) Maximiliano Estévez (Argentina) Juan-Martín Aranguren (Argentina) Hernán Casanova
April 23	Argentina F8 Futures; Neuquén, Argentina; Clay $10,000	(Peru) Sergio Galdós (Ecuador) Diego Hidalgo; 3–6, 6–3, [10–6]	(Chile) Cristóbal Saavedra Corvalán (Chile) Juan Carlos Sáez	(Argentina) Maximiliano Estévez (Argentina) Facundo Mena	(Argentina) Juan Pablo Ortiz (Argentina) Maximiliano Estévez (Argentina) Juan-Martín Aranguren (Argentina) Hernán Casanova
April 23	France F9 Futures; Grasse, France; Clay $15,000	(France) David Guez; 6–4, 7–6^{(7–3)}	(France) Florian Reynet	(Egypt) Sherif Sabry (France) Franck Pepe	(France) Lucas Pouille (France) Jonathan Eysseric (Monaco) Benjamin Balleret (France) Hugo Nys
April 23	France F9 Futures; Grasse, France; Clay $15,000	(France) Jonathan Eysseric (France) Nicolas Renavand; 6–3, 6–0	(France) Julien Obry (France) Florian Reynet	(Egypt) Sherif Sabry (France) Franck Pepe	(France) Lucas Pouille (France) Jonathan Eysseric (Monaco) Benjamin Balleret (France) Hugo Nys
April 23	Great Britain F6 Futures (United Kingdom) Bournemouth, United Kingdom; Clay $10,000	(United Kingdom) Oliver Golding; 7–6^{(7–4)}, 6–4	(United Kingdom) Andrew Fitzpatrick	(Sweden) Lucas Renard (United Kingdom) Richard Bloomfield	(United Kingdom) Liam Broady (United Kingdom) Matthew Short (Italy) Marco Bortolotti (United Kingdom) Toby Martin
April 23	Great Britain F6 Futures (United Kingdom) Bournemouth, United Kingdom; Clay $10,000	(Belgium) Arthur De Greef (France) Jérôme Inzerillo; 3–6, 6–1, [10–8]	(United Kingdom) Keelan Oakley (United Kingdom) Matthew Short	(Sweden) Lucas Renard (United Kingdom) Richard Bloomfield	(United Kingdom) Liam Broady (United Kingdom) Matthew Short (Italy) Marco Bortolotti (United Kingdom) Toby Martin
April 23	India F5 Futures; Madurai, India; Clay $10,000	(India) Jeevan Nedunchezhiyan; 4–6, 6–1, 7–6^{(7–4)}	(Spain) Marc Giner	(India) Vijayant Malik (Belgium) Yannick Vandenbulcke	(India) Vijay Sundar Prashanth (Belgium) Gaetan De Lovinfosse (India) Ranjeet Virali-Murugesan (India) Sriram Balaji
April 23	India F5 Futures; Madurai, India; Clay $10,000	(India) Sriram Balaji (India) Vignesh Peranamallur; 7–6^{(7–4)}, 7–6^{(7–5)}	(Portugal) André Gaspar Murta (Italy) Matthieu Vierin	(India) Vijayant Malik (Belgium) Yannick Vandenbulcke	(India) Vijay Sundar Prashanth (Belgium) Gaetan De Lovinfosse (India) Ranjeet Virali-Murugesan (India) Sriram Balaji
April 23	Italy F6 Futures; Vicenza, Italy; Clay $15,000	(Germany) Bastian Knittel; 6–4, 6–2	(Austria) Marc Rath	(Serbia) Ivan Bjelica (Germany) Moritz Baumann	(Belgium) Alexandre Folie (Brazil) Daniel Dutra da Silva (Switzerland) Sandro Ehrat (Netherlands) Boy Westerhof
April 23	Italy F6 Futures; Vicenza, Italy; Clay $15,000	(Italy) Viktor Galović (Italy) Federico Torresi; 3–6, 6–3, [10–8]	(Italy) Andrea Fava (Italy) Marco Speronello	(Serbia) Ivan Bjelica (Germany) Moritz Baumann	(Belgium) Alexandre Folie (Brazil) Daniel Dutra da Silva (Switzerland) Sandro Ehrat (Netherlands) Boy Westerhof
April 23	Mexico F4 Futures; Mexico City, Mexico; Hard $10,000	(Mexico) César Ramírez; 6–2, 6–4	(Mexico) Víctor Romero	(Mexico) Mauricio Astorga (Australia) Yuri Bezeruk	(New Zealand) Marvin Barker (Mexico) Miguel Gallardo Valles (United States) Adam El Mihdawy (Guatemala) Christopher Díaz Figueroa
April 23	Mexico F4 Futures; Mexico City, Mexico; Hard $10,000	(Mexico) Luis Díaz Barriga (Mexico) Daniel Garza; 6–4, 6–3	(New Zealand) Marvin Barker (Australia) Chris Letcher	(Mexico) Mauricio Astorga (Australia) Yuri Bezeruk	(New Zealand) Marvin Barker (Mexico) Miguel Gallardo Valles (United States) Adam El Mihdawy (Guatemala) Christopher Díaz Figueroa
April 23	Spain F9 Futures; Vic, Spain; Clay $10,000	(Russia) Aleksandr Lobkov; 7–6^{(8–6)}, 6–4	(Spain) Andoni Vivanco-Guzmán	(Venezuela) David Souto (Colombia) Juan Sebastián Gómez	(Argentina) Leonel Videla (Spain) Ricardo Ojeda Lara (Spain) Marc Fornell Mestres (France) Martin Vaïsse
April 23	Spain F9 Futures; Vic, Spain; Clay $10,000	(Russia) Aleksandr Lobkov (Venezuela) David Souto; 7–6^{(7–2)}, 7–6^{(7–4)}	(Venezuela) Jordi Muñoz Abreu (Spain) Ricardo Ojeda Lara	(Venezuela) David Souto (Colombia) Juan Sebastián Gómez	(Argentina) Leonel Videla (Spain) Ricardo Ojeda Lara (Spain) Marc Fornell Mestres (France) Martin Vaïsse
April 23	Turkey F16 Futures; Antalya-Belconti, Turkey; Hard $10,000	(Moldova) Radu Albot; 3–6, 6–4, 7–6^{(7–3)}	(Bosnia and Herzegovina) Tomislav Brkić	(Poland) Adam Chadaj (Brazil) Alex Blumenberg	(Bulgaria) Dimitar Kuzmanov (Moldova) Maxim Dubarenco (Australia) Brydan Klein (France) Sébastien Boltz
April 23	Turkey F16 Futures; Antalya-Belconti, Turkey; Hard $10,000	(Turkey) Tuna Altuna (Australia) Brydan Klein; 6–2, 6–4	(Poland) Adam Chadaj (Ukraine) Volodymyr Uzhylovskyi	(Poland) Adam Chadaj (Brazil) Alex Blumenberg	(Bulgaria) Dimitar Kuzmanov (Moldova) Maxim Dubarenco (Australia) Brydan Klein (France) Sébastien Boltz
April 23	Uzbekistan F2 Futures; Andijan, Uzbekistan; Hard $15,000	(India) Vishnu Vardhan; 6–3, 7–6^{(7–1)}	(Ukraine) Ivan Sergeyev	(Belarus) Uladzimir Ignatik (Russia) Evgeny Kirillov	(India) Karan Rastogi (Russia) Mikhail Vasiliev (Belarus) Dzmitry Zhyrmont (Ukraine) Artem Smirnov
April 23	Uzbekistan F2 Futures; Andijan, Uzbekistan; Hard $15,000	(Belarus) Uladzimir Ignatik (Latvia) Deniss Pavlovs; 6–4, 6–2	(Ukraine) Vladyslav Manafov (Belarus) Yaraslav Shyla	(Belarus) Uladzimir Ignatik (Russia) Evgeny Kirillov	(India) Karan Rastogi (Russia) Mikhail Vasiliev (Belarus) Dzmitry Zhyrmont (Ukraine) Artem Smirnov
April 30	Argentina F9 Futures; Villa Allende, Argentina; Clay $10,000	(Argentina) Sebastián Decoud; 4–6, 6–4, 6–3	(Argentina) Diego Schwartzman	(Argentina) Nicolás Pastor (Argentina) Juan-Pablo Amado	(Argentina) Leandro Migani (Japan) Ryusei Makiguchi (Argentina) Mateo Facundo Cressa (Argentina) Mauricio Pérez Mota
April 30	Argentina F9 Futures; Villa Allende, Argentina; Clay $10,000	(Argentina) Sebastián Decoud (Argentina) Diego Schwartzman; 6–3, 6–4	(Argentina) Juan Ignacio Londero (Argentina) Leandro Migani	(Argentina) Nicolás Pastor (Argentina) Juan-Pablo Amado	(Argentina) Leandro Migani (Japan) Ryusei Makiguchi (Argentina) Mateo Facundo Cressa (Argentina) Mauricio Pérez Mota
April 30	Bosnia & Herzegovina F1 Futures (Bosnia and Herzegovina) Doboj, Bosnia & Herzegovina; Clay $10,000	(Bosnia and Herzegovina) Damir Džumhur; 6–0, 4–6, 6–0	(France) Florian Reynet	(Croatia) Toni Androić (Croatia) Joško Topić	(Croatia) Mislav Hižak (Switzerland) Alexander Sadecky (Serbia) Denis Bejtulahi (France) Pierre-Hugues Herbert
April 30	Bosnia & Herzegovina F1 Futures (Bosnia and Herzegovina) Doboj, Bosnia & Herzegovina; Clay $10,000	(Slovenia) Miha Mlakar (Slovenia) Tomislav Ternar; 6–4, 3–6, [10–8]	(Croatia) Krešimir Ritz (Croatia) Joško Topić	(Croatia) Toni Androić (Croatia) Joško Topić	(Croatia) Mislav Hižak (Switzerland) Alexander Sadecky (Serbia) Denis Bejtulahi (France) Pierre-Hugues Herbert
April 30	Great Britain F7 Futures (United Kingdom) Edinburgh, United Kingdom; Clay $10,000	(France) Jérôme Inzerillo; 6–7^{(4–7)}, 6–4, 6–2	(France) Gleb Sakharov	(Germany) Sami Reinwein (United Kingdom) Luke Bambridge	(United Kingdom) Neil Pauffley (United Kingdom) Matthew Short (United Kingdom) Marcus Willis (Belgium) Arthur De Greef
April 30	Great Britain F7 Futures (United Kingdom) Edinburgh, United Kingdom; Clay $10,000	(Belgium) Arthur De Greef (France) Jérôme Inzerillo; 7–6^{(7–5)}, 3–6, [10–8]	(France) Gleb Sakharov (France) Alexandre Sidorenko	(Germany) Sami Reinwein (United Kingdom) Luke Bambridge	(United Kingdom) Neil Pauffley (United Kingdom) Matthew Short (United Kingdom) Marcus Willis (Belgium) Arthur De Greef
April 30	India F6 Futures; Chennai, India; Clay $10,000	(India) Sriram Balaji; 6–3, 6–4	(Switzerland) Joss Espasandin	(Netherlands) Mark Vervoort (India) Ranjeet Virali-Murugesan	(India) Vijayant Malik (India) Vijay Sundar Prashanth (India) Ashwin Vijayragavan (United States) Austin Karosi
April 30	India F6 Futures; Chennai, India; Clay $10,000	(India) Rupesh Roy (India) Vivek Shokeen; 6–2, 6–4	(India) Abhijeet Tiwari (India) Ashwin Vijayragavan	(Netherlands) Mark Vervoort (India) Ranjeet Virali-Murugesan	(India) Vijayant Malik (India) Vijay Sundar Prashanth (India) Ashwin Vijayragavan (United States) Austin Karosi
April 30	Israel F7 Futures; Ashkelon, Israel; Hard $10,000	(Israel) Amir Weintraub; 6–3, 6–2	(China) Chang Yu	(Slovakia) Marko Daniš (Chinese Taipei) Chen Ti	(United Kingdom) Toby Martin (China) Li Zhe (Israel) Tal Goldengoren (New Zealand) Marcus Daniell
April 30	Israel F7 Futures; Ashkelon, Israel; Hard $10,000	(China) Chang Yu (China) Li Zhe; 6–3, 6–2	(Israel) Saar Steele (Israel) Amir Weintraub	(Slovakia) Marko Daniš (Chinese Taipei) Chen Ti	(United Kingdom) Toby Martin (China) Li Zhe (Israel) Tal Goldengoren (New Zealand) Marcus Daniell
April 30	Italy F7 Futures; Sanremo, Italy; Clay $10,000	(Latvia) Andis Juška; 6–4, 6–3	(Italy) Alberto Brizzi	(Belgium) Julien Dubail (France) Jonathan Eysseric	(Italy) Marco Speronello (Australia) Alex Bolt (Italy) Claudio Grassi (Italy) Federico Torresi
April 30	Italy F7 Futures; Sanremo, Italy; Clay $10,000	(Italy) Claudio Grassi (Latvia) Andis Juška; 7–5, 6–7^{(2–7)}, [14–12]	(Italy) Matteo Donati (Italy) Viktor Galović	(Belgium) Julien Dubail (France) Jonathan Eysseric	(Italy) Marco Speronello (Australia) Alex Bolt (Italy) Claudio Grassi (Italy) Federico Torresi
April 30	Mexico F5 Futures; Celaya, Mexico; Hard $10,000	(Guatemala) Christopher Díaz Figueroa; 6–2, 6–0	(Mexico) Miguel Gallardo Valles	(United States) Adam El Mihdawy (United States) Devin Britton	(El Salvador) Marcelo Arévalo (Australia) Chris Letcher (Mexico) Mauricio Astorga (Mexico) Miguel Ángel Reyes-Varela
April 30	Mexico F5 Futures; Celaya, Mexico; Hard $10,000	(United States) Devin Britton (Barbados) Darian King; 2–6, 6–4, [10–4]	(Australia) Ben Wagland (Australia) Marious Zelba	(United States) Adam El Mihdawy (United States) Devin Britton	(El Salvador) Marcelo Arévalo (Australia) Chris Letcher (Mexico) Mauricio Astorga (Mexico) Miguel Ángel Reyes-Varela
April 30	Spain F10 Futures; Balaguer, Spain; Clay $10,000	(Venezuela) David Souto; 6–4, 6–4	(Italy) Lorenzo Giustino	(Spain) Miguel Ángel López Jaén (Spain) Juan-Samuel Arauzo-Martínez	(Belgium) Yannik Reuter (Russia) Vladislav Dubinsky (Colombia) Juan Sebastián Gómez (Spain) Gabriel Trujillo Soler
April 30	Spain F10 Futures; Balaguer, Spain; Clay $10,000	(Spain) Alejandro Andino Vallverdu (Spain) Andoni Vivanco-Guzmán; 7–5, 3–6, [10–4]	(Austria) Sebastian Bader (Austria) Lukas Koncilia	(Spain) Miguel Ángel López Jaén (Spain) Juan-Samuel Arauzo-Martínez	(Belgium) Yannik Reuter (Russia) Vladislav Dubinsky (Colombia) Juan Sebastián Gómez (Spain) Gabriel Trujillo Soler
April 30	Sweden F1 Futures; Karlskrona, Sweden; Clay $10,000	(Sweden) Patrik Rosenholm; 1–6, 7–6^{(7–3)}, 6–2	(Netherlands) Alban Meuffels	(Netherlands) Lennert van der Linden (Belgium) Alexandre Folie	(France) Albano Olivetti (Finland) Timo Nieminen (Finland) Henrik Sillanpää (Sweden) Ervin Eleskovic
April 30	Sweden F1 Futures; Karlskrona, Sweden; Clay $10,000	(France) Albano Olivetti (Chile) Hans Podlipnik Castillo; 6–3, 7–6^{(7–3)}	(United Kingdom) Lewis Burton (United Kingdom) George Morgan	(Netherlands) Lennert van der Linden (Belgium) Alexandre Folie	(France) Albano Olivetti (Finland) Timo Nieminen (Finland) Henrik Sillanpää (Sweden) Ervin Eleskovic
April 30	Turkey F17 Futures; Antalya-Belconti, Turkey; Hard $10,000	(Spain) Arnau Brugués Davi; 6–2, 6–4	(Australia) Brydan Klein	(Belarus) Egor Puntus (Moldova) Maxim Dubarenco	(Chile) Gonzalo Lama (Ukraine) Vadim Alekseenko (Bosnia and Herzegovina) Tomislav Brkić (Ukraine) Volodymyr Uzhylovskyi
April 30	Turkey F17 Futures; Antalya-Belconti, Turkey; Hard $10,000	(Turkey) Tuna Altuna (Australia) Brydan Klein; 6–1, 6–3	(Ukraine) Vadim Alekseenko (Russia) Sergei Krotiouk	(Belarus) Egor Puntus (Moldova) Maxim Dubarenco	(Chile) Gonzalo Lama (Ukraine) Vadim Alekseenko (Bosnia and Herzegovina) Tomislav Brkić (Ukraine) Volodymyr Uzhylovskyi
April 30	USA F11 Futures (United States) Vero Beach, United States; Clay $10,000	(Australia) John-Patrick Smith; 6–2, 6–0	(Brazil) Pedro Zerbini	(Lebanon) Bassam Beidas (United States) Tennys Sandgren	(Austria) Gerald Melzer (United Kingdom) Edward Corrie (United States) Jeff Dadamo (Australia) James Lemke
April 30	USA F11 Futures (United States) Vero Beach, United States; Clay $10,000	(United States) Benjamin Rogers (Australia) John-Patrick Smith; 5–7, 6–1, [11–9]	(United Kingdom) Edward Corrie (United States) Vahid Mirzadeh	(Lebanon) Bassam Beidas (United States) Tennys Sandgren	(Austria) Gerald Melzer (United Kingdom) Edward Corrie (United States) Jeff Dadamo (Australia) James Lemke

=== May ===
Week of	Tournament	Winner	Runners-up	Semifinalists	Quarterfinalists
May 7	Bosnia & Herzegovina F2 Futures (Bosnia and Herzegovina) Sarajevo, Bosnia & Herzegovina; Clay $10,000	(Bosnia and Herzegovina) Aldin Šetkić; 6–3, retired	(Serbia) Ivan Bjelica	(Serbia) Vladimir Obradović (Slovenia) Tomislav Ternar	(Slovakia) Filip Horanský (Serbia) Saša Stojisavljević (Austria) Lukas Weinhandl (Italy) Giammarco Micolani
May 7	Bosnia & Herzegovina F2 Futures (Bosnia and Herzegovina) Sarajevo, Bosnia & Herzegovina; Clay $10,000	(Slovenia) Tomislav Ternar (Austria) Lukas Weinhandl; 6–3, 7–6^{(7–4)}	(Slovenia) Andraž Bedene (Bosnia and Herzegovina) Damir Džumhur	(Serbia) Vladimir Obradović (Slovenia) Tomislav Ternar	(Slovakia) Filip Horanský (Serbia) Saša Stojisavljević (Austria) Lukas Weinhandl (Italy) Giammarco Micolani
May 7	Brazil F9 Futures; Goiânia, Brazil; Clay $10,000	(Brazil) Christian Lindell; 6–7^{(5–7)}, 6–4, 7–5	(Brazil) Thales Turini	(Brazil) João Pedro Sorgi (Brazil) José Pereira	(Brazil) Fabrício Neis (Chile) Nicolás Gustavo Kauer (Brazil) Eladio Ribeiro Neto (Brazil) Thiago Monteiro
May 7	Brazil F9 Futures; Goiânia, Brazil; Clay $10,000	(Brazil) Nicolas Santos (Brazil) Ricardo Siggia; 6–3, 7–6^{(8–6)}	(Brazil) Fabrício Neis (Brazil) José Pereira	(Brazil) João Pedro Sorgi (Brazil) José Pereira	(Brazil) Fabrício Neis (Chile) Nicolás Gustavo Kauer (Brazil) Eladio Ribeiro Neto (Brazil) Thiago Monteiro
May 7	Bulgaria F1 Futures; Varna, Bulgaria; Clay $10,000	(Ukraine) Ivan Sergeyev; 6–0 Ret.	(Romania) Teodor-Dacian Crăciun	(Egypt) Mohamed Safwat (Bulgaria) Tihomir Grozdanov	(Ukraine) Oleksandr Nedovyesov (Bulgaria) Dimitar Kuzmanov (Bulgaria) Todor Enev (Belgium) Alexandre Folie
May 7	Bulgaria F1 Futures; Varna, Bulgaria; Clay $10,000	(Ukraine) Oleksandr Nedovyesov (Ukraine) Ivan Sergeyev; 6–1, 6–1	(Bulgaria) Valentin Dimov (Bulgaria) Dimitar Kuzmanov	(Egypt) Mohamed Safwat (Bulgaria) Tihomir Grozdanov	(Ukraine) Oleksandr Nedovyesov (Bulgaria) Dimitar Kuzmanov (Bulgaria) Todor Enev (Belgium) Alexandre Folie
May 7	Czech Republic F1 Futures; Teplice, Czech Republic; Clay $10,000	(Austria) Dominic Thiem; 6–2, 6–4	(Austria) Marc Rath	(Czech Republic) Adam Pavlásek (Germany) Marko Lenz	(Czech Republic) Jan Šátral (Slovakia) Michal Pažický (Germany) Peter Heller (Czech Republic) Roman Jebavý
May 7	Czech Republic F1 Futures; Teplice, Czech Republic; Clay $10,000	(Austria) Lukas Jastraunig (Austria) Dominic Thiem; 6–4, 6–4	(Germany) Peter Heller (Germany) Ralf Steinbach	(Czech Republic) Adam Pavlásek (Germany) Marko Lenz	(Czech Republic) Jan Šátral (Slovakia) Michal Pažický (Germany) Peter Heller (Czech Republic) Roman Jebavý
May 7	Great Britain F8 Futures (United Kingdom) Newcastle, United Kingdom; Clay $10,000	(United Kingdom) Oliver Golding; 6–4, 6–1	(United Kingdom) Daniel Smethurst	(Netherlands) Kevin Griekspoor (United Kingdom) Andrew Fitzpatrick	(Belgium) Arthur De Greef (France) Nicolas Rosenzweig (United Kingdom) Kyle Edmund (Netherlands) Scott Griekspoor
May 7	Great Britain F8 Futures (United Kingdom) Newcastle, United Kingdom; Clay $10,000	(United Kingdom) Liam Broady (United Kingdom) Daniel Smethurst; 7–6^{(8–6)}, 6–0	(United Kingdom) Jack Carpenter (United Kingdom) Ashley Hewitt	(Netherlands) Kevin Griekspoor (United Kingdom) Andrew Fitzpatrick	(Belgium) Arthur De Greef (France) Nicolas Rosenzweig (United Kingdom) Kyle Edmund (Netherlands) Scott Griekspoor
May 7	Israel F8 Futures; Ramat HaSharon, Israel; Hard $10,000	(China) Li Zhe; 6–4, 7–5	(China) Chang Yu	(Chinese Taipei) Chen Ti (Belgium) Julien Dubail	(New Zealand) Marcus Daniell (France) Dorian Descloix (United Kingdom) Toby Martin (United Kingdom) Sean Thornley
May 7	Israel F8 Futures; Ramat HaSharon, Israel; Hard $10,000	(Chinese Taipei) Chen Ti (New Zealand) Marcus Daniell; 7–6^{(7–1)} Ret.	(Israel) Noam Behr (Israel) Noam Okun	(Chinese Taipei) Chen Ti (Belgium) Julien Dubail	(New Zealand) Marcus Daniell (France) Dorian Descloix (United Kingdom) Toby Martin (United Kingdom) Sean Thornley
May 7	Italy F8 Futures; Bergamo, Italy; Clay $10,000	(Italy) Luca Vanni; 6–4, 6–3	(Italy) Claudio Grassi	(Austria) Michael Linzer (Germany) Moritz Baumann	(Switzerland) Sandro Ehrat (Italy) Francesco Borgo (France) Jonathan Eysseric (Canada) Filip Peliwo
May 7	Italy F8 Futures; Bergamo, Italy; Clay $10,000	(Germany) Moritz Baumann (Switzerland) Sandro Ehrat; 6–2, 6–2	(Italy) Claudio Grassi (Italy) Matteo Volante	(Austria) Michael Linzer (Germany) Moritz Baumann	(Switzerland) Sandro Ehrat (Italy) Francesco Borgo (France) Jonathan Eysseric (Canada) Filip Peliwo
May 7	Mexico F6 Futures; Guadalajara, Mexico; Hard $10,000	(France) Antoine Benneteau; 6–7^{(4–7)}, 6–3, 7–5	(United States) Adam El Mihdawy	(Barbados) Darian King (United States) Devin Britton	(El Salvador) Marcelo Arévalo (Mexico) Aldo Aaron Arteaga (Mexico) Miguel Ángel Reyes-Varela (Mexico) Miguel Gallardo Valles
May 7	Mexico F6 Futures; Guadalajara, Mexico; Hard $10,000	(United States) Devin Britton (Barbados) Darian King; 6–4, 5–7, [10–4]	(Mexico) Miguel Ángel Reyes-Varela (Mexico) Bruno Rodríguez	(Barbados) Darian King (United States) Devin Britton	(El Salvador) Marcelo Arévalo (Mexico) Aldo Aaron Arteaga (Mexico) Miguel Ángel Reyes-Varela (Mexico) Miguel Gallardo Valles
May 7	Spain F11 Futures; Lleida, Spain; Clay $10,000	(Spain) Sergio Gutiérrez Ferrol; 3–6, 6–1, 7–5	(Canada) Steven Diez	(Spain) Roberto Carballés Baena (Germany) Jean-Marc Werner	(Russia) Ivan Nedelko (Japan) Taro Daniel (Spain) David Estruch (Russia) Anton Zaitcev
May 7	Spain F11 Futures; Lleida, Spain; Clay $10,000	(Spain) Jordi Marse-Vidri (Spain) Carles Poch Gradin; 6–3, 3–6, [10–7]	(Spain) Miguel Ángel López Jaén (Spain) Gabriel Trujillo Soler	(Spain) Roberto Carballés Baena (Germany) Jean-Marc Werner	(Russia) Ivan Nedelko (Japan) Taro Daniel (Spain) David Estruch (Russia) Anton Zaitcev
May 7	Sweden F2 Futures; Båstad, Sweden; Clay $10,000	(Chile) Hans Podlipnik Castillo; 7–6^{(7–4)}, 7–5	(Netherlands) Boy Westerhof	(Romania) Cătălin-Ionuţ Gârd (Finland) Timo Nieminen	(Netherlands) Wesley Koolhof (Sweden) Patrik Rosenholm (Denmark) Søren Wedege (France) Élie Rousset
May 7	Sweden F2 Futures; Båstad, Sweden; Clay $10,000	(Estonia) Vladimir Ivanov (Poland) Andriej Kapaś; 6–4, 5–7, [10–4]	(Australia) Peter Luczak (Australia) Blake Mott	(Romania) Cătălin-Ionuţ Gârd (Finland) Timo Nieminen	(Netherlands) Wesley Koolhof (Sweden) Patrik Rosenholm (Denmark) Søren Wedege (France) Élie Rousset
May 7	Thailand F1 Futures; Bangkok, Thailand; Hard $10,000	(Australia) Luke Saville; 2–6, 6–4, 6–0	(France) Antoine Escoffier	(Japan) Shuichi Sekiguchi (Germany) Richard Becker	(Japan) Arata Onozawa (Australia) Nick Lindahl (United States) Tyler Hochwalt (South Africa) Ruan Roelofse
May 7	Thailand F1 Futures; Bangkok, Thailand; Hard $10,000	(Thailand) Weerapat Doakmaiklee (Japan) Hiroki Kondo; 6–0, 6–4	(Australia) Scott Puodziunas (Australia) Gavin van Peperzeel	(Japan) Shuichi Sekiguchi (Germany) Richard Becker	(Japan) Arata Onozawa (Australia) Nick Lindahl (United States) Tyler Hochwalt (South Africa) Ruan Roelofse
May 7	Turkey F18 Futures; Antalya-Belconti, Turkey; Hard $10,000	(Germany) Robin Kern; 6–3, 7–6^{(7–4)}	(Spain) Arnau Brugués Davi	(Ukraine) Volodymyr Uzhylovskyi (Moldova) Maxim Dubarenco	(Austria) Tristan-Samuel Weissborn (Russia) Sergei Krotiouk (Russia) Andrei Plotniy (Australia) Brydan Klein
May 7	Turkey F18 Futures; Antalya-Belconti, Turkey; Hard $10,000	(Turkey) Tuna Altuna (Australia) Brydan Klein; 6–0, 6–3	(Russia) Ilya Belyaev (Turkey) Baris Erguden	(Ukraine) Volodymyr Uzhylovskyi (Moldova) Maxim Dubarenco	(Austria) Tristan-Samuel Weissborn (Russia) Sergei Krotiouk (Russia) Andrei Plotniy (Australia) Brydan Klein
May 7	USA F12 Futures (United States) Orange Park, United States; Clay $10,000	(Austria) Gerald Melzer; 7–6^{(7–5)}, 6–3	(United States) Tennys Sandgren	(United States) Greg Ouellette (United States) Reid Carleton	(United States) Christian Harrison (United States) Joshua Zavala (United States) Phillip Simmonds (Zimbabwe) Takanyi Garanganga
May 7	USA F12 Futures (United States) Orange Park, United States; Clay $10,000	(United States) Phillip Simmonds (South Africa) Fritz Wolmarans; 6–3, 6–7^{(5–7)}, [12–10]	(United States) Benjamin Rogers (Australia) John-Patrick Smith	(United States) Greg Ouellette (United States) Reid Carleton	(United States) Christian Harrison (United States) Joshua Zavala (United States) Phillip Simmonds (Zimbabwe) Takanyi Garanganga
May 7	Venezuela F1 Futures; Maracay, Venezuela; Hard $10,000	(Ecuador) Julio César Campozano; 6–4, 6–3	(Peru) Mauricio Echazú	(Colombia) Nicolás Barrientos (Venezuela) David Souto	(Bolivia) Hugo Dellien (Argentina) Maximiliano Estévez (Colombia) Michael Quintero (United States) Jason Jung
May 7	Venezuela F1 Futures; Maracay, Venezuela; Hard $10,000	(Venezuela) Piero Luisi (Venezuela) Román Recarte; 6–7^{(5–7)}, 6–1, [10–5]	(Bolivia) Mauricio Doria-Medina (Peru) Mauricio Echazú	(Colombia) Nicolás Barrientos (Venezuela) David Souto	(Bolivia) Hugo Dellien (Argentina) Maximiliano Estévez (Colombia) Michael Quintero (United States) Jason Jung
May 14	Bosnia & Herzegovina F3 Futures (Bosnia and Herzegovina) Brčko, Bosnia & Herzegovina; Clay $10,000	(Bosnia and Herzegovina) Damir Džumhur; 7–6^{(7–2)}, 6–2	(Croatia) Toni Androić	(Croatia) Nikola Mektić (Croatia) Joško Topić	(Netherlands) Wesley Koolhof (Croatia) Duje Kekez (Croatia) Mislav Hižak (Bosnia and Herzegovina) Tomislav Brkić
May 14	Bosnia & Herzegovina F3 Futures (Bosnia and Herzegovina) Brčko, Bosnia & Herzegovina; Clay $10,000	(Croatia) Nikola Mektić (Croatia) Ante Pavić; 6–1, 6–3	(Slovakia) Filip Horanský (Bosnia and Herzegovina) Aldin Šetkić	(Croatia) Nikola Mektić (Croatia) Joško Topić	(Netherlands) Wesley Koolhof (Croatia) Duje Kekez (Croatia) Mislav Hižak (Bosnia and Herzegovina) Tomislav Brkić
May 14	Brazil F10 Futures; Manaus, Brazil; Clay (indoor) $15,000	(Brazil) Fernando Romboli; 6–3, 6–4	(Brazil) João Pedro Sorgi	(Brazil) Fabrício Neis (Brazil) Christian Lindell	(Chile) Jorge Aguilar (Brazil) Thales Turini (Brazil) Bruno Sant'Anna (Brazil) Thiago Monteiro
May 14	Brazil F10 Futures; Manaus, Brazil; Clay (indoor) $15,000	(Brazil) Guilherme Clezar (United States) Andrea Collarini; 7–6^{(9–7)}, 3–6, [10–5]	(Brazil) Fabrício Neis (Brazil) José Pereira	(Brazil) Fabrício Neis (Brazil) Christian Lindell	(Chile) Jorge Aguilar (Brazil) Thales Turini (Brazil) Bruno Sant'Anna (Brazil) Thiago Monteiro
May 14	Bulgaria F2 Futures; Plovdiv, Bulgaria; Clay $10,000	(Ukraine) Ivan Sergeyev; 6–4, 6–2	(Italy) Edoardo Eremin	(Greece) Theodoros Angelinos (Ukraine) Oleksandr Nedovyesov	(Netherlands) Antal van der Duim (Egypt) Mohamed Safwat (Switzerland) Sandro Ehrat (Czech Republic) Jiří Školoudík
May 14	Bulgaria F2 Futures; Plovdiv, Bulgaria; Clay $10,000	The doubles event has been cancelled after the first round.		(Greece) Theodoros Angelinos (Ukraine) Oleksandr Nedovyesov	(Netherlands) Antal van der Duim (Egypt) Mohamed Safwat (Switzerland) Sandro Ehrat (Czech Republic) Jiří Školoudík
May 14	China F7 Futures; Zhangjiagang, China; Hard $15,000	(China) Bai Yan; 7–5, 7–6^{(10–8)}	(China) Chang Yu	(China) Wu Di (China) Gong Maoxin	(South Korea) Daniel Yoo (Japan) Takuto Niki (Japan) Kento Takeuchi (Japan) Arata Onozawa
May 14	China F7 Futures; Zhangjiagang, China; Hard $15,000	(South Korea) Nam Ji-sung (South Korea) Noh Sang-woo; 6–2, 6–4	(China) Gong Maoxin (China) Xue Feng	(China) Wu Di (China) Gong Maoxin	(South Korea) Daniel Yoo (Japan) Takuto Niki (Japan) Kento Takeuchi (Japan) Arata Onozawa
May 14	Czech Republic F2 Futures; Most, Czech Republic; Clay $10,000	(Czech Republic) Marek Michalička; 6–1, 6–2	(Germany) Marc Sieber	(Slovakia) Andrej Martin (Russia) Alexey Vatutin	(Ukraine) Vadim Alekseenko (Austria) Dominic Thiem (Slovakia) Adrian Partl (Czech Republic) Jan Šátral
May 14	Czech Republic F2 Futures; Most, Czech Republic; Clay $10,000	(Czech Republic) Jaroslav Pospíšil (Czech Republic) Jiří Veselý; 6–1, 6–4	(Canada) Érik Chvojka (Czech Republic) Marek Michalička	(Slovakia) Andrej Martin (Russia) Alexey Vatutin	(Ukraine) Vadim Alekseenko (Austria) Dominic Thiem (Slovakia) Adrian Partl (Czech Republic) Jan Šátral
May 14	Israel F9 Futures; Ramat HaSharon, Israel; Hard $10,000	(Switzerland) Michael Lammer; 6–4, 6–0	(France) Dorian Descloix	(Israel) Noam Okun (Chinese Taipei) Chen Ti	(Republic of Ireland) Sam Barry (Israel) Gilad Ben Zvi (Colombia) Cristian Rodríguez (United Kingdom) Sean Thornley
May 14	Israel F9 Futures; Ramat HaSharon, Israel; Hard $10,000	(Chinese Taipei) Chen Ti (New Zealand) Marcus Daniell; 6–0, 6–2	(Israel) Aviv Ben Shabat (Israel) Noam Okun	(Israel) Noam Okun (Chinese Taipei) Chen Ti	(Republic of Ireland) Sam Barry (Israel) Gilad Ben Zvi (Colombia) Cristian Rodríguez (United Kingdom) Sean Thornley
May 14	Italy F9 Futures; Pozzuoli, Italy; Clay $15,000	(Italy) Andrea Arnaboldi; 6–1, 6–4	(Italy) Luca Vanni	(Germany) Moritz Baumann (Italy) Alessio di Mauro	(Italy) Walter Trusendi (Italy) Claudio Grassi (Australia) Matt Reid (Italy) Gianluigi Quinzi
May 14	Italy F9 Futures; Pozzuoli, Italy; Clay $15,000	(Italy) Claudio Grassi (Italy) Walter Trusendi; 6–3, 6–2	(Italy) Alessio di Mauro (Italy) Stefano Napolitano	(Germany) Moritz Baumann (Italy) Alessio di Mauro	(Italy) Walter Trusendi (Italy) Claudio Grassi (Australia) Matt Reid (Italy) Gianluigi Quinzi
May 14	Korea F1 Futures (South Korea) Daegu, Korea; Hard $15,000	(Australia) Samuel Groth; 6–7^{(4–7)}, 6–4, 6–1	(Denmark) Frederik Nielsen	(Australia) Matthew Barton (South Korea) Na Jung-woong	(Chinese Taipei) Huang Liang-chi (Poland) Michał Przysiężny (Australia) Adam Hubble (Japan) Hiroyasu Ehara
May 14	Korea F1 Futures (South Korea) Daegu, Korea; Hard $15,000	(Australia) Samuel Groth (Australia) Adam Hubble; 6–1, 6–4	(South Korea) Chung Hong (South Korea) Jeong Suk-young	(Australia) Matthew Barton (South Korea) Na Jung-woong	(Chinese Taipei) Huang Liang-chi (Poland) Michał Przysiężny (Australia) Adam Hubble (Japan) Hiroyasu Ehara
May 14	Mexico F7 Futures; Morelia, Mexico; Hard $10,000	(United States) Adam El Mihdawy; 7–5, 6–1	(France) Antoine Benneteau	(Mexico) Luis Díaz Barriga (Mexico) Miguel Gallardo Valles	(El Salvador) Marcelo Arévalo (Australia) Chris Letcher (Guatemala) Christopher Díaz Figueroa (Mexico) Miguel Ángel Reyes-Varela
May 14	Mexico F7 Futures; Morelia, Mexico; Hard $10,000	(Mexico) Miguel Ángel Reyes-Varela (Mexico) Bruno Rodríguez; 6–4, 6–2	(New Zealand) Marvin Barker (Australia) Chris Letcher	(Mexico) Luis Díaz Barriga (Mexico) Miguel Gallardo Valles	(El Salvador) Marcelo Arévalo (Australia) Chris Letcher (Guatemala) Christopher Díaz Figueroa (Mexico) Miguel Ángel Reyes-Varela
May 14	Romania F1 Futures; Cluj, Romania; Clay $15,000	(Poland) Marcin Gawron; 6–1, 6–3	(Moldova) Radu Albot	(Croatia) Dino Marcan (Romania) Marius Copil	(Canada) Peter Polansky (Hungary) Dénes Lukács (Romania) Andrei Dăescu (Spain) Sergio Gutiérrez Ferrol
May 14	Romania F1 Futures; Cluj, Romania; Clay $15,000	(Romania) Andrei Dăescu (Romania) Florin Mergea; 7–6^{(7–2)}, 6–1	(Romania) Llaurentiu-Ady Gavrilă (Romania) Dragoș Cristian Mirtea	(Croatia) Dino Marcan (Romania) Marius Copil	(Canada) Peter Polansky (Hungary) Dénes Lukács (Romania) Andrei Dăescu (Spain) Sergio Gutiérrez Ferrol
May 14	Spain F12 Futures; Valldoreix, Spain; Clay $10,000	(Spain) Jordi Samper Montaña; 4–6, 7–6^{(7–2)}, 7–5	(Japan) Taro Daniel	(Germany) Jan-Lennard Struff (Spain) Roberto Carballés Baena	(Spain) David Estruch (Spain) Enrique López Pérez (Russia) Ivan Nedelko (Spain) José Checa Calvo
May 14	Spain F12 Futures; Valldoreix, Spain; Clay $10,000	(Spain) Oriol Roca Batalla (Spain) Jordi Samper Montaña; 5–7, 6–2, [10–6]	(Spain) Miguel Ángel López Jaén (Spain) Carles Poch Gradin	(Germany) Jan-Lennard Struff (Spain) Roberto Carballés Baena	(Spain) David Estruch (Spain) Enrique López Pérez (Russia) Ivan Nedelko (Spain) José Checa Calvo
May 14	Sweden F3 Futures; Båstad, Sweden; Clay $10,000	(Finland) Timo Nieminen; 2–6, 7–5, 6–2	(France) Lucas Pouille	(Chile) Hans Podlipnik Castillo (United Kingdom) Joshua Milton	(Sweden) Kalle Averfalk (Romania) Cătălin-Ionuţ Gârd (Austria) Bastian Trinker (France) Mathias Bourgue
May 14	Sweden F3 Futures; Båstad, Sweden; Clay $10,000	(United Kingdom) Lewis Burton (United Kingdom) George Morgan; 6–3, 6–1	(Sweden) Pierre Bonfre (Sweden) Viktor Stjern	(Chile) Hans Podlipnik Castillo (United Kingdom) Joshua Milton	(Sweden) Kalle Averfalk (Romania) Cătălin-Ionuţ Gârd (Austria) Bastian Trinker (France) Mathias Bourgue
May 14	Thailand F2 Futures; Bangkok, Thailand; Hard $10,000	(New Zealand) José Statham; 7–6^{(12–10)}, 6–3	(Indonesia) Christopher Rungkat	(Germany) Richard Becker (Kuwait) Abdullah Maqdes	(Japan) Shuichi Sekiguchi (France) Antoine Escoffier (Australia) Luke Saville (Thailand) Wishaya Trongcharoenchaikul
May 14	Thailand F2 Futures; Bangkok, Thailand; Hard $10,000	(New Zealand) Logan Mackenzie (New Zealand) José Statham; Walkover	(South Africa) Jean Andersen (Germany) Richard Becker	(Germany) Richard Becker (Kuwait) Abdullah Maqdes	(Japan) Shuichi Sekiguchi (France) Antoine Escoffier (Australia) Luke Saville (Thailand) Wishaya Trongcharoenchaikul
May 14	Turkey F19 Futures; Mersin, Turkey; Clay $10,000	(Austria) Michael Linzer; 6–0, 6–3	(Germany) Dieter Kindlmann	(France) François-Arthur Vibert (France) Florian Reynet	(Germany) Steven Moneke (Serbia) Nikola Ćaćić (Australia) Maverick Banes (Belgium) Alexandre Folie
May 14	Turkey F19 Futures; Mersin, Turkey; Clay $10,000	(Australia) Maverick Banes (New Zealand) Sebastian Lavie; 6–4, 3–6, [10–7]	(Austria) Maximilian Neuchrist (Croatia) Mate Pavić	(France) François-Arthur Vibert (France) Florian Reynet	(Germany) Steven Moneke (Serbia) Nikola Ćaćić (Australia) Maverick Banes (Belgium) Alexandre Folie
May 14	USA F13 Futures (United States) Tampa, United States; Clay $10,000	(United States) Tennys Sandgren; 6–1, 6–3	(United States) Bjorn Fratangelo	(United States) Michael Redlicki (United States) Christian Harrison	(Canada) Philip Bester (Philippines) Ruben Gonzales (Brazil) Pedro Zerbini (Haiti) Olivier Sajous
May 14	USA F13 Futures (United States) Tampa, United States; Clay $10,000	(Canada) Philip Bester (Canada) Kamil Pajkowski; 7–6^{(8–6)}, 6–1	(Barbados) Haydn Lewis (Haiti) Olivier Sajous	(United States) Michael Redlicki (United States) Christian Harrison	(Canada) Philip Bester (Philippines) Ruben Gonzales (Brazil) Pedro Zerbini (Haiti) Olivier Sajous
May 14	Venezuela F2 Futures; Caracas, Venezuela; Hard $10,000	(Ecuador) Julio César Campozano; 6–4, 6–3	(Venezuela) David Souto	(Argentina) Maximiliano Estévez (Colombia) Michael Quintero	(Argentina) Guido Andreozzi (Argentina) Juan Vázquez-Valenzuela (Colombia) Nicolás Barrientos (Sweden) Oskar Pallin
May 14	Venezuela F2 Futures; Caracas, Venezuela; Hard $10,000	(Venezuela) Luis David Martínez (Venezuela) David Souto; 2–6, 7–6^{(8–6)}, [10–4]	(Argentina) Maximiliano Estévez (Argentina) Benjamin Tenti	(Argentina) Maximiliano Estévez (Colombia) Michael Quintero	(Argentina) Guido Andreozzi (Argentina) Juan Vázquez-Valenzuela (Colombia) Nicolás Barrientos (Sweden) Oskar Pallin
May 21	Bosnia & Herzegovina F4 Futures (Bosnia and Herzegovina) Prijedor, Bosnia & Herzegovina; Clay $10,000	(Croatia) Nikola Mektić; 5–7, 7–5, 6–0	(Croatia) Marin Bradarić	(Bosnia and Herzegovina) Mirza Bašić (Bosnia and Herzegovina) Tomislav Brkić	(Serbia) Ivan Bjelica (Bosnia and Herzegovina) Aldin Šetkić (Croatia) Kristijan Mesaroš (Serbia) Miljan Zekić
May 21	Bosnia & Herzegovina F4 Futures (Bosnia and Herzegovina) Prijedor, Bosnia & Herzegovina; Clay $10,000	The doubles event has been cancelled during the first round.		(Bosnia and Herzegovina) Mirza Bašić (Bosnia and Herzegovina) Tomislav Brkić	(Serbia) Ivan Bjelica (Bosnia and Herzegovina) Aldin Šetkić (Croatia) Kristijan Mesaroš (Serbia) Miljan Zekić
May 21	Brazil F11 Futures; Bauru, Brazil; Clay $10,000	(Brazil) Thiago Monteiro; 2–6, 6–2, 7–6^{(8–6)}	(Brazil) Leonardo Kirche	(Brazil) André Miele (Brazil) José Pereira	(Brazil) Fabrício Neis (Brazil) Fabiano de Paula (Brazil) Bruno Sant'Anna (Brazil) Wilson Leite
May 21	Brazil F11 Futures; Bauru, Brazil; Clay $10,000	(Brazil) Rodrigo-Antonio Grilli (Brazil) Diego Matos; 6–3, 6–3	(Brazil) Fabiano de Paula (Brazil) Christian Lindell	(Brazil) André Miele (Brazil) José Pereira	(Brazil) Fabrício Neis (Brazil) Fabiano de Paula (Brazil) Bruno Sant'Anna (Brazil) Wilson Leite
May 21	Bulgaria F3 Futures; Sofia, Bulgaria; Clay $10,000	(Switzerland) Sandro Ehrat; 6–3, 6–3	(Germany) Moritz Baumann	(Egypt) Mohamed Safwat (Montenegro) Goran Tošić	(France) Gleb Sakharov (Russia) Mikhail Vasiliev (Serbia) Arsenije Zlatanovic (Italy) Roberto Marcora
May 21	Bulgaria F3 Futures; Sofia, Bulgaria; Clay $10,000	(Germany) Moritz Baumann (Switzerland) Sandro Ehrat; 6–1, 6–1	(Bulgaria) Dinko Halachev (Bulgaria) Petar Trendafilov	(Egypt) Mohamed Safwat (Montenegro) Goran Tošić	(France) Gleb Sakharov (Russia) Mikhail Vasiliev (Serbia) Arsenije Zlatanovic (Italy) Roberto Marcora
May 21	Chile F5 Futures; Santiago, Chile; Clay $10,000	(Argentina) Sebastián Decoud; 6–2, 6–2	(Chile) Juan Carlos Sáez	(Chile) Jorge Aguilar (Chile) Cristóbal Saavedra Corvalán	(Argentina) Gabriel Alejandro Hidalgo (Argentina) Federico Coria (Chile) Guillermo Rivera Aránguiz (Argentina) Juan-Martín Aranguren
May 21	Chile F5 Futures; Santiago, Chile; Clay $10,000	(Argentina) Sebastián Decoud (Argentina) Matias Salinas; 6–2, 6–3	(United States) Reid Carleton (United States) Daniel Stahl	(Chile) Jorge Aguilar (Chile) Cristóbal Saavedra Corvalán	(Argentina) Gabriel Alejandro Hidalgo (Argentina) Federico Coria (Chile) Guillermo Rivera Aránguiz (Argentina) Juan-Martín Aranguren
May 21	China F8 Futures; Fuzhou, China; Hard $15,000	(China) Wu Di; 6–1, 6–2	(Chinese Taipei) Chen Ti	(Japan) Kento Takeuchi (China) Li Zhe	(China) Chang Yu (South Korea) Noh Sang-woo (Japan) Arata Onozawa (China) Lu Yang
May 21	China F8 Futures; Fuzhou, China; Hard $15,000	(China) Gao Xin (China) Li Zhe; 6–2, 6–3	(Japan) Takuto Niki (Japan) Arata Onozawa	(Japan) Kento Takeuchi (China) Li Zhe	(China) Chang Yu (South Korea) Noh Sang-woo (Japan) Arata Onozawa (China) Lu Yang
May 21	Czech Republic F3 Futures; Jablonec nad Nisou, Czech Republic; Clay $10,000	(Slovakia) Andrej Martin; 6–4, 6–2	(Czech Republic) Jaroslav Pospíšil	(Germany) George von Massow (Austria) Dominic Thiem	(Czech Republic) Marek Michalička (Czech Republic) Jan Šátral (Austria) Marc Rath (Slovakia) Norbert Gombos
May 21	Czech Republic F3 Futures; Jablonec nad Nisou, Czech Republic; Clay $10,000	(Czech Republic) Jaroslav Pospíšil (Czech Republic) Jiří Veselý; 7–5, 6–4	(Australia) Peter Luczak (Australia) Blake Mott	(Germany) George von Massow (Austria) Dominic Thiem	(Czech Republic) Marek Michalička (Czech Republic) Jan Šátral (Austria) Marc Rath (Slovakia) Norbert Gombos
May 21	Korea F2 Futures (South Korea) Changwon, Korea; Hard $15,000	(Poland) Michał Przysiężny; 3–6, 7–5, 6–3	(Australia) Samuel Groth	(South Korea) Kim Cheong-eui (Chinese Taipei) Huang Liang-chi	(Australia) Nima Roshan (United States) Michael McClune (South Korea) Jun Woong-sun (South Korea) Jeong Suk-young
May 21	Korea F2 Futures (South Korea) Changwon, Korea; Hard $15,000	(Australia) Michael Look (Denmark) Frederik Nielsen; 6–2, 6–1	(Chinese Taipei) Huang Liang-chi (Chinese Taipei) Yi Chu-huan	(South Korea) Kim Cheong-eui (Chinese Taipei) Huang Liang-chi	(Australia) Nima Roshan (United States) Michael McClune (South Korea) Jun Woong-sun (South Korea) Jeong Suk-young
May 21	Mexico F8 Futures; Puebla, Mexico; Hard $10,000	(El Salvador) Marcelo Arévalo; 7–6^{(7–5)}, 5–7, 6–2	(France) Antoine Benneteau	(Mexico) Luis Díaz Barriga (Australia) Chris Letcher	(Mexico) Miguel Gallardo Valles (South Africa) Keith-Patrick Crowley (Mexico) Miguel Ángel Reyes-Varela (Guatemala) Christopher Díaz Figueroa
May 21	Mexico F8 Futures; Puebla, Mexico; Hard $10,000	(Mexico) Alejandro Moreno Figueroa (Mexico) Miguel Ángel Reyes-Varela; 6–2, 7–5	(El Salvador) Marcelo Arévalo (Colombia) Felipe Mantilla	(Mexico) Luis Díaz Barriga (Australia) Chris Letcher	(Mexico) Miguel Gallardo Valles (South Africa) Keith-Patrick Crowley (Mexico) Miguel Ángel Reyes-Varela (Guatemala) Christopher Díaz Figueroa
May 21	Morocco F1 Futures; Kenitra, Morocco; Clay $10,000	(Chile) Hans Podlipnik Castillo; 6–4, 6–1	(Algeria) Lamine Ouahab	(Belgium) Yannik Reuter (Spain) José Checa Calvo	(Egypt) Sherif Sabry (France) Constantin Belot (Belgium) Germain Gigounon (Morocco) Mehdi Ziadi
May 21	Morocco F1 Futures; Kenitra, Morocco; Clay $10,000	(Belgium) Germain Gigounon (Belgium) Yannik Reuter; 6–3, 5–7, [10–6]	(Algeria) Lamine Ouahab (Morocco) Younès Rachidi	(Belgium) Yannik Reuter (Spain) José Checa Calvo	(Egypt) Sherif Sabry (France) Constantin Belot (Belgium) Germain Gigounon (Morocco) Mehdi Ziadi
May 21	Peru F1 Futures; Chosica, Peru; Clay $10,000	(Argentina) Renzo Olivo; 7–5, 3–6, 6–1	(Peru) Duilio Beretta	(Argentina) Juan-Pablo Amado (Brazil) Marcelo Demoliner	(Peru) Mauricio Echazú (Peru) Sergio Galdós (Colombia) Nicolás Barrientos (Argentina) Juan Ignacio Londero
May 21	Peru F1 Futures; Chosica, Peru; Clay $10,000	(Brazil) Marcelo Demoliner (Argentina) Renzo Olivo; 6–3, 7–6^{(10–8)}	(Peru) Duilio Beretta (Peru) Sergio Galdós	(Argentina) Juan-Pablo Amado (Brazil) Marcelo Demoliner	(Peru) Mauricio Echazú (Peru) Sergio Galdós (Colombia) Nicolás Barrientos (Argentina) Juan Ignacio Londero
May 21	Poland F1 Futures; Sobota, Poland; Clay $15,000	(Canada) Steven Diez; 7–6^{(7–4)}, 6–3	(Poland) Andriej Kapaś	(Hungary) Attila Balázs (Poland) Paweł Ciaś	(Poland) Grzegorz Panfil (Poland) Mateusz Kowalczyk (Ukraine) Volodymyr Uzhylovskyi (Czech Republic) Michal Konečný
May 21	Poland F1 Futures; Sobota, Poland; Clay $15,000	(Poland) Tomasz Bednarek (Poland) Mateusz Kowalczyk; 6–2, 6–7^{(5–7)}, [11–9]	(Belarus) Aliaksandr Bury (Latvia) Deniss Pavlovs	(Hungary) Attila Balázs (Poland) Paweł Ciaś	(Poland) Grzegorz Panfil (Poland) Mateusz Kowalczyk (Ukraine) Volodymyr Uzhylovskyi (Czech Republic) Michal Konečný
May 21	Romania F2 Futures; Bucharest, Romania; Clay $10,000	(Germany) Kevin Krawietz; 6–2, 7–5	(Croatia) Dino Marcan	(Spain) Sergio Gutiérrez Ferrol (Italy) Viktor Galović	(Romania) Dragoș Dima (Italy) Marco Viola (Germany) Jaan-Frederik Brunken (Romania) Teodor-Dacian Crăciun
May 21	Romania F2 Futures; Bucharest, Romania; Clay $10,000	(Romania) Andrei Dăescu (Romania) Florin Mergea; 7–6^{(7–4)}, 6–2	(Romania) Marius Copil (Romania) Victor Crivoi	(Spain) Sergio Gutiérrez Ferrol (Italy) Viktor Galović	(Romania) Dragoș Dima (Italy) Marco Viola (Germany) Jaan-Frederik Brunken (Romania) Teodor-Dacian Crăciun
May 21	Spain F13 Futures; Getxo, Spain; Clay $10,000	(Italy) Andrea Arnaboldi; 3–6, 7–6^{(7–4)}, 6–4	(Netherlands) Thiemo de Bakker	(United States) Rhyne Williams (Spain) Andoni Vivanco-Guzmán	(France) Lucas Pouille (Spain) Enrique López Pérez (Japan) Taro Daniel (Spain) Carlos Gómez-Herrera
May 21	Spain F13 Futures; Getxo, Spain; Clay $10,000	(Spain) Iván Arenas-Gualda (Spain) Enrique López Pérez; 6–7^{(5–7)}, 7–6^{(7–4)}, [10–7]	(United States) Austin Krajicek (United States) Rhyne Williams	(United States) Rhyne Williams (Spain) Andoni Vivanco-Guzmán	(France) Lucas Pouille (Spain) Enrique López Pérez (Japan) Taro Daniel (Spain) Carlos Gómez-Herrera
May 21	Thailand F3 Futures; Bangkok, Thailand; Hard $10,000	(Indonesia) Christopher Rungkat; 6–2, 6–2	(France) Antoine Escoffier	(Germany) Dominik Schulz (Australia) Isaac Frost	(China) Ouyang Bowen (Kuwait) Abdullah Maqdes (Australia) Gavin van Peperzeel (United States) Nathaniel Gorham
May 21	Thailand F3 Futures; Bangkok, Thailand; Hard $10,000	(Chinese Taipei) Lee Hsin-han (Chinese Taipei) Peng Hsien-yin; 7–6^{(7–3)}, 6–3	(Indonesia) Christopher Rungkat (Indonesia) David Agung Susanto	(Germany) Dominik Schulz (Australia) Isaac Frost	(China) Ouyang Bowen (Kuwait) Abdullah Maqdes (Australia) Gavin van Peperzeel (United States) Nathaniel Gorham
May 21	Turkey F20 Futures; Mersin, Turkey; Clay $10,000	(Germany) Peter Heller; 6–2, 7–6^{(7–4)}	(Germany) Steven Moneke	(Croatia) Mate Pavić (Serbia) Nikola Ćaćić	(Belgium) Alexandre Folie (Australia) Maverick Banes (France) Florian Reynet (Germany) Dieter Kindlmann
May 21	Turkey F20 Futures; Mersin, Turkey; Clay $10,000	(United Kingdom) James Feaver (Republic of Ireland) Daniel Glancy; 7–6^{(7–5)}, 6–3	(Australia) Maverick Banes (New Zealand) Sebastian Lavie	(Croatia) Mate Pavić (Serbia) Nikola Ćaćić	(Belgium) Alexandre Folie (Australia) Maverick Banes (France) Florian Reynet (Germany) Dieter Kindlmann
May 21	Venezuela F3 Futures; Valencia, Venezuela; Hard $10,000	(Ecuador) Julio César Campozano; 6–3, 6–1	(Argentina) Maximiliano Estévez	(Venezuela) David Souto (Venezuela) Ricardo Rodríguez	(Colombia) Eduardo Struvay (Venezuela) Luis David Martínez (United States) Maciek Sykut (Argentina) Guido Andreozzi
May 21	Venezuela F3 Futures; Valencia, Venezuela; Hard $10,000	(Venezuela) Piero Luisi (Venezuela) Román Recarte; 6–2, 6–3	(Colombia) Felipe Escobar (Colombia) Eduardo Struvay	(Venezuela) David Souto (Venezuela) Ricardo Rodríguez	(Colombia) Eduardo Struvay (Venezuela) Luis David Martínez (United States) Maciek Sykut (Argentina) Guido Andreozzi
May 28	Bosnia & Herzegovina F5 Futures (Bosnia and Herzegovina) Kiseljak, Bosnia & Herzegovina; Clay $10,000	(Bosnia and Herzegovina) Damir Džumhur; 6–3, 7–6^{(7–3)}	(Slovakia) Norbert Gombos	(Bosnia and Herzegovina) Tomislav Brkić (Croatia) Mate Delić	(Serbia) Arsenije Zlatanovic (Croatia) Mate Pavić (Bosnia and Herzegovina) Aldin Šetkić (Austria) Björn Propst
May 28	Bosnia & Herzegovina F5 Futures (Bosnia and Herzegovina) Kiseljak, Bosnia & Herzegovina; Clay $10,000	(Croatia) Marin Bradarić (Croatia) Mate Pavić; 7–6^{(7–4)}, 7–6^{(9–7)}	(Serbia) Danilo Petrović (Canada) Milan Pokrajac	(Bosnia and Herzegovina) Tomislav Brkić (Croatia) Mate Delić	(Serbia) Arsenije Zlatanovic (Croatia) Mate Pavić (Bosnia and Herzegovina) Aldin Šetkić (Austria) Björn Propst
May 28	Brazil F12 Futures; Teresina, Brazil; Clay $10,000	(Brazil) Fabiano de Paula; 4–6, 6–4, 6–2	(Brazil) Leonardo Kirche	(Brazil) Christian Lindell (Brazil) André Miele	(Brazil) Thales Turini (Brazil) Marcos Vinicius da Silva Dias (Brazil) Augusto Laranja (Brazil) Eduardo Dischinger
May 28	Brazil F12 Futures; Teresina, Brazil; Clay $10,000	(Brazil) Fabiano de Paula (Brazil) Christian Lindell; 6–4, 7–6^{(7–4)}	(Brazil) Wilson Leite (Brazil) Carlos Eduardo Severino	(Brazil) Christian Lindell (Brazil) André Miele	(Brazil) Thales Turini (Brazil) Marcos Vinicius da Silva Dias (Brazil) Augusto Laranja (Brazil) Eduardo Dischinger
May 28	Chile F6 Futures; Viña del Mar, Chile; Clay $10,000	(Chile) Cristóbal Saavedra Corvalán; 6–4, 6–1	(Chile) Guillermo Rivera Aránguiz	(Argentina) Sebastián Decoud (Ecuador) Diego Hidalgo	(United States) Reid Carleton (Argentina) Hernán Casanova (Argentina) Gabriel Alejandro Hidalgo (Argentina) Federico Coria
May 28	Chile F6 Futures; Viña del Mar, Chile; Clay $10,000	(Chile) Jorge Aguilar (Chile) Juan Carlos Sáez; 4–6, 6–1, [10–5]	(Chile) Guillermo Rivera Aránguiz (Chile) Cristóbal Saavedra Corvalán	(Argentina) Sebastián Decoud (Ecuador) Diego Hidalgo	(United States) Reid Carleton (Argentina) Hernán Casanova (Argentina) Gabriel Alejandro Hidalgo (Argentina) Federico Coria
May 28	India F7 Futures; Mandya, India; Hard $10,000	(India) Saketh Myneni; 6–3, 6–4	(India) Vijayant Malik	(India) Sriram Balaji (India) Ranjeet Virali-Murugesan	(China) Ouyang Bowen (India) Kaza Vinayak Sharma (France) Sébastien Boltz (India) Vignesh Veerabadran
May 28	India F7 Futures; Mandya, India; Hard $10,000	(India) Sriram Balaji (India) Arun-Prakash Rajagopalan; 7–5, 6–1	(India) Saketh Myneni (China) Ouyang Bowen	(India) Sriram Balaji (India) Ranjeet Virali-Murugesan	(China) Ouyang Bowen (India) Kaza Vinayak Sharma (France) Sébastien Boltz (India) Vignesh Veerabadran
May 28	Italy F11 Futures; Cesena, Italy; Clay $15,000+H	(Serbia) Nikola Ćirić; 6–4, 6–4	(United States) Blake Strode	(Italy) Daniele Giorgini (Argentina) Marco Trungelliti	(Argentina) Diego Junqueira (Canada) Pierre-Ludovic Duclos (Argentina) Guido Pella (Italy) Simone Vagnozzi
May 28	Italy F11 Futures; Cesena, Italy; Clay $15,000+H	(United States) Nicholas Monroe (Germany) Simon Stadler; 4–6, 6–3, [10–5]	(Serbia) Nikola Ćirić (Serbia) Miljan Zekić	(Italy) Daniele Giorgini (Argentina) Marco Trungelliti	(Argentina) Diego Junqueira (Canada) Pierre-Ludovic Duclos (Argentina) Guido Pella (Italy) Simone Vagnozzi
May 28	Korea F3 Futures (South Korea) Gimcheon, Korea; Hard $15,000	(China) Wu Di; 6–1, 6–1	(United States) Michael McClune	(Poland) Michał Przysiężny (Australia) John Millman	(South Korea) Jeong Suk-young (China) Gong Maoxin (Chinese Taipei) Huang Liang-chi (South Korea) Na Jung-woong
May 28	Korea F3 Futures (South Korea) Gimcheon, Korea; Hard $15,000	(Chinese Taipei) Huang Liang-chi (Chinese Taipei) Yi Chu-huan; 6–3, 6–3	(United States) Michael McClune (Australia) Nima Roshan	(Poland) Michał Przysiężny (Australia) John Millman	(South Korea) Jeong Suk-young (China) Gong Maoxin (Chinese Taipei) Huang Liang-chi (South Korea) Na Jung-woong
May 28	Morocco F2 Futures; Rabat, Morocco; Clay $10,000	(Algeria) Lamine Ouahab; 6–2, 6–3	(Belgium) Yannik Reuter	(Spain) José Checa Calvo (Belgium) Niels Desein	(Chile) Hans Podlipnik Castillo (Egypt) Sherif Sabry (Spain) Marc Giner (Belgium) Arthur De Greef
May 28	Morocco F2 Futures; Rabat, Morocco; Clay $10,000	(Belgium) Niels Desein (France) Alexandre Penaud; 6–1, 2–6, [13–11]	(Sweden) Kalle Averfalk (Sweden) Robin Olin	(Spain) José Checa Calvo (Belgium) Niels Desein	(Chile) Hans Podlipnik Castillo (Egypt) Sherif Sabry (Spain) Marc Giner (Belgium) Arthur De Greef
May 28	Peru F2 Futures; Lima, Peru; Clay $10,000	(Argentina) Diego Schwartzman; 6–2, 6–2	(Colombia) Michael Quintero	(Brazil) Fernando Romboli (Brazil) Marcelo Demoliner	(Colombia) Nicolás Barrientos (Argentina) Juan-Pablo Amado (Peru) Duilio Beretta (Argentina) Renzo Olivo
May 28	Peru F2 Futures; Lima, Peru; Clay $10,000	(Brazil) Marcelo Demoliner (Argentina) Renzo Olivo; 2–6, 7–5, [10–5]	(Brazil) Victor Maynard (Brazil) Fernando Romboli	(Brazil) Fernando Romboli (Brazil) Marcelo Demoliner	(Colombia) Nicolás Barrientos (Argentina) Juan-Pablo Amado (Peru) Duilio Beretta (Argentina) Renzo Olivo
May 28	Poland F2 Futures; Koszalin, Poland; Clay $10,000	(Sweden) Patrik Rosenholm; 6–4, 3–6, 6–4	(Poland) Piotr Gadomski	(Poland) Grzegorz Panfil (Belarus) Dzmitry Zhyrmont	(Ukraine) Volodymyr Uzhylovskyi (Estonia) Vladimir Ivanov (Poland) Andriej Kapaś (Chile) Guillermo Hormazábal
May 28	Poland F2 Futures; Koszalin, Poland; Clay $10,000	(Chile) Guillermo Hormazábal (Poland) Grzegorz Panfil; 6–2, 6–7^{(4–7)}, [10–5]	(Belarus) Egor Gerasimov (Belarus) Dzmitry Zhyrmont	(Poland) Grzegorz Panfil (Belarus) Dzmitry Zhyrmont	(Ukraine) Volodymyr Uzhylovskyi (Estonia) Vladimir Ivanov (Poland) Andriej Kapaś (Chile) Guillermo Hormazábal
May 28	Romania F3 Futures; Bacău, Romania; Clay $15,000	(Moldova) Radu Albot; 7–5, 6–4	(Moldova) Roman Borvanov	(Argentina) Agustín Velotti (Finland) Harri Heliövaara	(Romania) Marius Copil (Finland) Timo Nieminen (Romania) Victor Crivoi (Germany) Jan-Lennard Struff
May 28	Romania F3 Futures; Bacău, Romania; Clay $15,000	(Romania) Marius Copil (Romania) Victor Crivoi; 6–3, 6–4	(Finland) Harri Heliövaara (Finland) Timo Nieminen	(Argentina) Agustín Velotti (Finland) Harri Heliövaara	(Romania) Marius Copil (Finland) Timo Nieminen (Romania) Victor Crivoi (Germany) Jan-Lennard Struff
May 28	Slovenia F1 Futures; Bled, Slovenia; Clay $10,000	(Croatia) Nikola Mektić; 1–6, 6–2, 6–4	(Germany) Marcel Zimmermann	(Austria) Nikolaus Moser (Italy) Walter Trusendi	(Belgium) Julien Dubail (Austria) Dominic Thiem (Italy) Marco Bortolotti (Slovenia) Nik Razboršek
May 28	Slovenia F1 Futures; Bled, Slovenia; Clay $10,000	(Croatia) Mislav Hižak (Austria) Tristan-Samuel Weissborn; Walkover	(Slovenia) Aljaž Bedene (Slovenia) Grega Žemlja	(Austria) Nikolaus Moser (Italy) Walter Trusendi	(Belgium) Julien Dubail (Austria) Dominic Thiem (Italy) Marco Bortolotti (Slovenia) Nik Razboršek
May 28	Spain F14 Futures; Madrid, Spain; Clay $10,000	(United States) Rhyne Williams; 6–7^{(4–7)}, 6–2, 6–1	(Spain) Sergio Gutiérrez Ferrol	(Colombia) Alejandro González (Italy) Lorenzo Giustino	(Egypt) Mohamed Safwat (Spain) Iván Arenas-Gualda (Spain) David Estruch (Spain) Roberto Carballés Baena
May 28	Spain F14 Futures; Madrid, Spain; Clay $10,000	(Spain) Iván Arenas-Gualda (Spain) Enrique López Pérez; 6–0, 6–2	(Greece) Alexandros Jakupovic (Netherlands) Mark Vervoort	(Colombia) Alejandro González (Italy) Lorenzo Giustino	(Egypt) Mohamed Safwat (Spain) Iván Arenas-Gualda (Spain) David Estruch (Spain) Roberto Carballés Baena
May 28	Turkey F21 Futures; Mersin, Turkey; Clay $10,000	(France) Florian Reynet; 4–6, 6–1, 6–4	(Ukraine) Ivan Sergeyev	(Ukraine) Oleksandr Nedovyesov (France) Davy Sum	(Australia) Brydan Klein (Sweden) Patrik Brydolf (Russia) Stanislav Vovk (Russia) Aslan Karatsev
May 28	Turkey F21 Futures; Mersin, Turkey; Clay $10,000	(Ukraine) Oleksandr Nedovyesov (Ukraine) Ivan Sergeyev; 3–6, 6–1, [10–7]	(Australia) Maverick Banes (Australia) Brydan Klein	(Ukraine) Oleksandr Nedovyesov (France) Davy Sum	(Australia) Brydan Klein (Sweden) Patrik Brydolf (Russia) Stanislav Vovk (Russia) Aslan Karatsev

=== June ===
Week of	Tournament	Winner	Runners-up	Semifinalists	Quarterfinalists
June 4	Argentina F11 Futures; San Francisco, Argentina; Clay $10,000	(Argentina) Diego Schwartzman; 6–3, 6–1	(Argentina) Facundo Argüello	(Argentina) Leandro Migani (United States) Andrea Collarini	(Argentina) Guillermo Durán (Argentina) Renzo Olivo (Argentina) Mauricio Pérez Mota (Argentina) Andrés Molteni
June 4	Argentina F11 Futures; San Francisco, Argentina; Clay $10,000	(Argentina) Facundo Argüello (Argentina) Diego Schwartzman; 6–2, 6–2	(Uruguay) Martín Cuevas (Argentina) José María Paniagua	(Argentina) Leandro Migani (United States) Andrea Collarini	(Argentina) Guillermo Durán (Argentina) Renzo Olivo (Argentina) Mauricio Pérez Mota (Argentina) Andrés Molteni
June 4	Chile F7 Futures; Concón, Chile; Clay $10,000	(Chile) Jorge Aguilar; 7–6^{(7–4)}, 6–4	(Chile) Guillermo Rivera Aránguiz	(United States) Reid Carleton (Chile) Juan Carlos Sáez	(Argentina) Sebastián Decoud (Chile) Vicente Bronstein (Chile) Jorge Montero (Ecuador) Diego Hidalgo
June 4	Chile F7 Futures; Concón, Chile; Clay $10,000	(Chile) Jorge Aguilar (Chile) Juan Carlos Sáez; 6–1, 6–2	(Argentina) Federico Coria (Argentina) Sebastián Decoud	(United States) Reid Carleton (Chile) Juan Carlos Sáez	(Argentina) Sebastián Decoud (Chile) Vicente Bronstein (Chile) Jorge Montero (Ecuador) Diego Hidalgo
June 4	India F8 Futures; Mysore, India; Hard $10,000	(India) Vishnu Vardhan; 7–6^{(9–7)}, 6–3	(India) Sriram Balaji	(Thailand) Kittiphong Wachiramanowong (India) Vijayant Malik	(Chinese Taipei) Chen Ti (India) Jeevan Nedunchezhiyan (India) Saketh Myneni (India) Sidharth Rawat
June 4	India F8 Futures; Mysore, India; Hard $10,000	(India) Sriram Balaji (India) Arun-Prakash Rajagopalan; 3–6, 6–1, [10–6]	(India) Kunal Anand (India) Ajai Selvaraj	(Thailand) Kittiphong Wachiramanowong (India) Vijayant Malik	(Chinese Taipei) Chen Ti (India) Jeevan Nedunchezhiyan (India) Saketh Myneni (India) Sidharth Rawat
June 4	Italy F12 Futures; Parma, Italy; Clay $15,000	(Chile) Guillermo Hormazábal; 6–2, 5–7, 6–3	(Italy) Andrea Arnaboldi	(Italy) Viktor Galović (Italy) Claudio Grassi	(Italy) Filippo Leonardi (Italy) Federico Gaio (Italy) Matteo Trevisan (Italy) Giulio Torroni
June 4	Italy F12 Futures; Parma, Italy; Clay $15,000	(Italy) Edoardo Eremin (Italy) Claudio Grassi; 7–5, 6–2	(Italy) Federico Gaio (Italy) Matteo Volante	(Italy) Viktor Galović (Italy) Claudio Grassi	(Italy) Filippo Leonardi (Italy) Federico Gaio (Italy) Matteo Trevisan (Italy) Giulio Torroni
June 4	Morocco F3 Futures; Casablanca, Morocco; Clay $10,000	(Algeria) Lamine Ouahab; 6–0, 6–2	(Morocco) Mehdi Ziadi	(Spain) Marc Giner (Spain) Guillermo Gómez-Díaz	(France) Jérôme Inzerillo (Austria) Lukas Koncilia (Morocco) Yassine Idmbarek (France) François-Arthur Vibert
June 4	Morocco F3 Futures; Casablanca, Morocco; Clay $10,000	(Algeria) Lamine Ouahab (Morocco) Younès Rachidi; 6–0, 6–2	(Austria) Sebastian Bader (Austria) Lukas Koncilia	(Spain) Marc Giner (Spain) Guillermo Gómez-Díaz	(France) Jérôme Inzerillo (Austria) Lukas Koncilia (Morocco) Yassine Idmbarek (France) François-Arthur Vibert
June 4	Peru F3 Futures; Lima, Peru; Clay $10,000	(Brazil) Marcelo Demoliner; 7–6^{(7–3)}, 6–2	(Argentina) Juan-Pablo Amado	(Brazil) Fernando Romboli (Peru) Duilio Beretta	(Peru) Mauricio Echazú (Brazil) Nicolas Santos (Argentina) Juan Pablo Ortiz (Bolivia) Mauricio Doria-Medina
June 4	Peru F3 Futures; Lima, Peru; Clay $10,000	(Argentina) Facundo Mena (Argentina) Juan Pablo Ortiz; 6–1, 6–3	(Brazil) Nicolas Santos (Brazil) Ricardo Siggia	(Brazil) Fernando Romboli (Peru) Duilio Beretta	(Peru) Mauricio Echazú (Brazil) Nicolas Santos (Argentina) Juan Pablo Ortiz (Bolivia) Mauricio Doria-Medina
June 4	Poland F3 Futures; Bytom, Poland; Clay $15,000	(Slovakia) Adrian Sikora; 6–4, 7–5	(Czech Republic) Michal Konečný	(Czech Republic) Marek Michalička (Poland) Mateusz Kowalczyk	(Poland) Andriej Kapaś (Spain) Roberto Carballés Baena (Ukraine) Stanislav Poplavskyy (Belarus) Dzmitry Zhyrmont
June 4	Poland F3 Futures; Bytom, Poland; Clay $15,000	(Poland) Mateusz Kowalczyk (Poland) Grzegorz Panfil; 6–4, 7–6^{(7–3)}	(Poland) Piotr Gadomski (Belarus) Andrei Vasilevski	(Czech Republic) Marek Michalička (Poland) Mateusz Kowalczyk	(Poland) Andriej Kapaś (Spain) Roberto Carballés Baena (Ukraine) Stanislav Poplavskyy (Belarus) Dzmitry Zhyrmont
June 4	Slovenia F2 Futures; Maribor, Slovenia; Clay $10,000	(Romania) Petru-Alexandru Luncanu; 6–3, 6–1	(Austria) Dennis Novak	(United Kingdom) Daniel Smethurst (Italy) Erik Crepaldi	(Serbia) Miki Janković (Italy) Nicola Ghedin (Belgium) Julien Dubail (Australia) Alex Bolt
June 4	Slovenia F2 Futures; Maribor, Slovenia; Clay $10,000	(Australia) Alex Bolt (Australia) Andrew Whittington; 6–4, 7–6^{(7–4)}	(Serbia) Miki Janković (Slovenia) Nik Razboršek	(United Kingdom) Daniel Smethurst (Italy) Erik Crepaldi	(Serbia) Miki Janković (Italy) Nicola Ghedin (Belgium) Julien Dubail (Australia) Alex Bolt
June 4	Spain F15 Futures; Santa Margarida de Montbui, Spain; Hard $10,000	(Japan) Taro Daniel; 7–5, 7–5	(Russia) Aleksandr Lobkov	(Spain) José Checa Calvo (Spain) Jordi Samper Montaña	(Spain) Gabriel Trujillo Soler (Venezuela) David Souto (Romania) Robert Coman (Spain) Marcos Giraldi Requena
June 4	Spain F15 Futures; Santa Margarida de Montbui, Spain; Hard $10,000	(Spain) Jordi Marse-Vidri (Spain) Carles Poch Gradin; 7–5, 7–5	(Spain) David Biosca Girvent (Spain) Oriol Roca Batalla	(Spain) José Checa Calvo (Spain) Jordi Samper Montaña	(Spain) Gabriel Trujillo Soler (Venezuela) David Souto (Romania) Robert Coman (Spain) Marcos Giraldi Requena
June 4	Turkey F22 Futures; Konya, Turkey; Hard $10,000	(Ukraine) Oleksandr Nedovyesov; 6–2, 7–6^{(7–2)}	(Ukraine) Ivan Sergeyev	(Russia) Mikhail Vasiliev (Turkey) Anıl Yüksel	(Australia) Brydan Klein (Russia) Richard Muzaev (Turkey) Haluk Akkoyun (United States) William Boe-Wiegaard
June 4	Turkey F22 Futures; Konya, Turkey; Hard $10,000	(Ukraine) Oleksandr Nedovyesov (Ukraine) Ivan Sergeyev; 7–6^{(7–5)}, 6–1	(United States) William Boe-Wiegaard (Republic of Ireland) Daniel Glancy	(Russia) Mikhail Vasiliev (Turkey) Anıl Yüksel	(Australia) Brydan Klein (Russia) Richard Muzaev (Turkey) Haluk Akkoyun (United States) William Boe-Wiegaard
June 4	USA F14 Futures (United States) Sacramento, United States; Hard $15,000	(United States) Devin Britton; 2–6, 7–6^{(7–6)}, 6–2	(United States) Jeff Dadamo	(Germany) Sebastian Fanselow (United States) Nicolas Meister	(United States) Jason Jung (United States) Michael McClune (Brazil) Pedro Zerbini (Canada) Philip Bester
June 4	USA F14 Futures (United States) Sacramento, United States; Hard $15,000	(United States) Vahid Mirzadeh (United States) Phillip Simmonds; 6–4, 3–6, [11–9]	(United States) Nicolas Meister (Brazil) Pedro Zerbini	(Germany) Sebastian Fanselow (United States) Nicolas Meister	(United States) Jason Jung (United States) Michael McClune (Brazil) Pedro Zerbini (Canada) Philip Bester
June 11	Argentina F12 Futures; Posadas, Argentina; Clay $10,000	(United States) Andrea Collarini; 4–6, 6–2, 6–3	(Argentina) Andrés Molteni	(Argentina) Facundo Argüello (Brazil) Bruno Sant'Anna	(Argentina) Bruno Tiberti (Argentina) Juan-Martín Aranguren (Argentina) Guillermo Durán (Argentina) Facundo Manzanares
June 11	Argentina F12 Futures; Posadas, Argentina; Clay $10,000	(Argentina) Franco Agamenone (Argentina) Facundo Argüello; 6–2, 6–2	(Brazil) Diego Matos (Argentina) Juan Vázquez-Valenzuela	(Argentina) Facundo Argüello (Brazil) Bruno Sant'Anna	(Argentina) Bruno Tiberti (Argentina) Juan-Martín Aranguren (Argentina) Guillermo Durán (Argentina) Facundo Manzanares
June 11	Brazil F13 Futures; Lins, Brazil; Clay $10,000	(Brazil) Fernando Romboli; 6–2, 6–4	(Brazil) Bruno Semenzato	(Brazil) André Miele (Argentina) Maximiliano Estévez	(Brazil) Fabrício Neis (Ecuador) Diego Hidalgo (Brazil) Alexandre Tsuchiya (Brazil) João Pedro Sorgi
June 11	Brazil F13 Futures; Lins, Brazil; Clay $10,000	(Brazil) Henrique Cunha (Brazil) Bruno Semenzato; 7–5, 6–3	(Brazil) Idio Escobar (Brazil) Marlon Oliveira	(Brazil) André Miele (Argentina) Maximiliano Estévez	(Brazil) Fabrício Neis (Ecuador) Diego Hidalgo (Brazil) Alexandre Tsuchiya (Brazil) João Pedro Sorgi
June 11	Germany F5 Futures; Munich-Unterföhring, Germany; Clay $10,000	(New Zealand) José Statham; 7–6^{(7–3)}, 7–5	(Germany) Jeremy Jahn	(Germany) Dominik Meffert (Hungary) Dénes Lukács	(Germany) Peter Heller (Switzerland) Alexander Ritschard (Germany) Kevin Krawietz (France) Gleb Sakharov
June 11	Germany F5 Futures; Munich-Unterföhring, Germany; Clay $10,000	(Mexico) Miguel Ángel Reyes-Varela (Mexico) Bruno Rodríguez; 3–6, 6–2, [10–7]	(Germany) Dominik Meffert (Germany) Michael Spegel	(Germany) Dominik Meffert (Hungary) Dénes Lukács	(Germany) Peter Heller (Switzerland) Alexander Ritschard (Germany) Kevin Krawietz (France) Gleb Sakharov
June 11	India F9 Futures; Bangalore, India; Hard $10,000	(India) Vishnu Vardhan; 6–2, 4–6, 6–1	(Chinese Taipei) Chen Ti	(India) Jeevan Nedunchezhiyan (India) Ranjeet Virali-Murugesan	(India) Ashwin Vijayragavan (Thailand) Warit Sornbutnark (India) Vijayant Malik (India) Sriram Balaji
June 11	India F9 Futures; Bangalore, India; Hard $10,000	(India) Jeevan Nedunchezhiyan (India) Ranjeet Virali-Murugesan; 4–6, 6–3, [10–7]	(India) Sriram Balaji (India) Arun-Prakash Rajagopalan	(India) Jeevan Nedunchezhiyan (India) Ranjeet Virali-Murugesan	(India) Ashwin Vijayragavan (Thailand) Warit Sornbutnark (India) Vijayant Malik (India) Sriram Balaji
June 11	Italy F13 Futures; Padova, Italy; Clay $15,000	(Italy) Luca Vanni; 6–7^{(3–7)}, 6–3, 6–4	(Argentina) Jonathan Gonzalia	(Spain) Roberto Carballés Baena (Argentina) Guillermo Carry	(United Kingdom) Morgan Phillips (France) David Guez (Italy) Matteo Fago (France) Jonathan Eysseric
June 11	Italy F13 Futures; Padova, Italy; Clay $15,000	(Italy) Claudio Grassi (Italy) Matteo Volante; 6–2, 6–0	(Italy) Marco Stancati (Italy) Luca Vanni	(Spain) Roberto Carballés Baena (Argentina) Guillermo Carry	(United Kingdom) Morgan Phillips (France) David Guez (Italy) Matteo Fago (France) Jonathan Eysseric
June 11	Japan F5 Futures; Karuizawa, Japan; Clay $10,000	(South Korea) Nam Ji-sung; 6–4, 6–4	(United States) Adam El Mihdawy	(Japan) Arata Onozawa (Japan) Takuto Niki	(Japan) Hiroyasu Ehara (South Korea) Jun Woong-sun (Japan) Hiromasa Oku (Japan) Bumpei Sato
June 11	Japan F5 Futures; Karuizawa, Japan; Clay $10,000	(Japan) Takuto Niki (Japan) Shota Tagawa; 6–4, 6–4	(Japan) Gengo Kikuchi (Japan) Yuki Matsuo	(Japan) Arata Onozawa (Japan) Takuto Niki	(Japan) Hiroyasu Ehara (South Korea) Jun Woong-sun (Japan) Hiromasa Oku (Japan) Bumpei Sato
June 11	Netherlands F1 Futures; Zuidwolde, Netherlands; Clay $15,000	(Netherlands) Thiemo de Bakker; 6–4, 4–6, 6–3	(Netherlands) Nick van der Meer	(Sweden) Michael Ryderstedt (France) Alexandre Sidorenko	(Brazil) Tiago Fernandes (Chile) Hans Podlipnik Castillo (Belgium) Julien Dubail (Bulgaria) Alexandar Lazov
June 11	Netherlands F1 Futures; Zuidwolde, Netherlands; Clay $15,000	(Netherlands) Thiemo de Bakker (Netherlands) Antal van der Duim; 6–4, 6–0	(Sweden) Patrik Rosenholm (Sweden) Michael Ryderstedt	(Sweden) Michael Ryderstedt (France) Alexandre Sidorenko	(Brazil) Tiago Fernandes (Chile) Hans Podlipnik Castillo (Belgium) Julien Dubail (Bulgaria) Alexandar Lazov
June 11	Peru F4 Futures; Arequipa, Peru; Clay $10,000+H	(El Salvador) Marcelo Arévalo; 6–4, 7–5	(Brazil) Marcelo Demoliner	(Japan) Ryusei Makiguchi (Argentina) Juan Ignacio Londero	(Colombia) Nicolás Barrientos (Bolivia) Boris Arias (Peru) Duilio Beretta (Chile) Guillermo Rivera Aránguiz
June 11	Peru F4 Futures; Arequipa, Peru; Clay $10,000+H	(El Salvador) Marcelo Arévalo (Brazil) Marcelo Demoliner; 6–2, 6–2	(Argentina) Andres Ceppo (Colombia) Felipe Mantilla	(Japan) Ryusei Makiguchi (Argentina) Juan Ignacio Londero	(Colombia) Nicolás Barrientos (Bolivia) Boris Arias (Peru) Duilio Beretta (Chile) Guillermo Rivera Aránguiz
June 11	Serbia F1 Futures; Belgrade, Serbia; Clay $10,000	(Croatia) Duje Kekez; 6–4, 4–6, 5–2 Ret.	(Romania) Dragoș Dima	(Spain) Enrique López Pérez (Canada) Milan Pokrajac	(Serbia) Nikola Ćaćić (Bosnia and Herzegovina) Aldin Šetkić (Serbia) Danilo Petrović (Serbia) Saša Stojisavljević
June 11	Serbia F1 Futures; Belgrade, Serbia; Clay $10,000	(Serbia) Nikola Ćaćić (Montenegro) Goran Tošić; 6–4, 6–4	(Serbia) Danilo Petrović (Canada) Milan Pokrajac	(Spain) Enrique López Pérez (Canada) Milan Pokrajac	(Serbia) Nikola Ćaćić (Bosnia and Herzegovina) Aldin Šetkić (Serbia) Danilo Petrović (Serbia) Saša Stojisavljević
June 11	Slovenia F3 Futures; Litija, Slovenia; Clay $10,000	(Italy) Riccardo Bellotti; 6–1, 6–3	(Italy) Roberto Marcora	(Australia) Andrew Whittington (Moldova) Maxim Dubarenco	(Czech Republic) Michal Konečný (Germany) Marc Sieber (Germany) Steven Moneke (Slovenia) Tomislav Ternar
June 11	Slovenia F3 Futures; Litija, Slovenia; Clay $10,000	(Germany) Steven Moneke (Germany) Marc Sieber; 6–2, 2–6, [10–8]	(Mexico) Daniel Garza (Australia) Thanasi Kokkinakis	(Australia) Andrew Whittington (Moldova) Maxim Dubarenco	(Czech Republic) Michal Konečný (Germany) Marc Sieber (Germany) Steven Moneke (Slovenia) Tomislav Ternar
June 11	Spain F16 Futures; Martos, Spain; Hard $10,000	(Spain) José Checa Calvo; 6–4, 6–3	(Spain) Gerard Granollers Pujol	(Japan) Taro Daniel (Venezuela) Ricardo Rodríguez	(Spain) Rafael Mazón-Hernández (Spain) Andrés Artuñedo (Spain) Ricardo Villacorta-Alonso (Spain) Carlos Gómez-Herrera
June 11	Spain F16 Futures; Martos, Spain; Hard $10,000	(Spain) Iván Arenas-Gualda (Spain) Jaime Pulgar-García; 7–6^{(7–4)}, 7–6^{(9–7)}	(Republic of Ireland) Sam Barry (Republic of Ireland) James Cluskey	(Japan) Taro Daniel (Venezuela) Ricardo Rodríguez	(Spain) Rafael Mazón-Hernández (Spain) Andrés Artuñedo (Spain) Ricardo Villacorta-Alonso (Spain) Carlos Gómez-Herrera
June 11	Turkey F23 Futures; Tekirdağ, Turkey; Hard $10,000	(Australia) Brydan Klein; 6–3, 6–1	(Italy) Lorenzo Giustino	(Russia) Mikhail Vasiliev (France) Yannick Jankovits	(Turkey) Baris Erguden (Turkey) Haluk Akkoyun (Greece) Theodoros Angelinos (United States) William Boe-Wiegaard
June 11	Turkey F23 Futures; Tekirdağ, Turkey; Hard $10,000	(Greece) Paris Gemouchidis (Greece) Alexandros Jakupovic; 7–6^{(10–8)}, 6–1	(Sweden) Jesper Brunström (Sweden) Patrik Brydolf	(Russia) Mikhail Vasiliev (France) Yannick Jankovits	(Turkey) Baris Erguden (Turkey) Haluk Akkoyun (Greece) Theodoros Angelinos (United States) William Boe-Wiegaard
June 11	USA F15 Futures (United States) Chico, United States; Hard $15,000	(United States) Phillip Simmonds; 4–6, 6–2, 6–2	(United States) Michael McClune	(South Africa) Fritz Wolmarans (Japan) Kento Takeuchi	(United States) Tennys Sandgren (United States) Devin Britton (United States) Joshua Zavala (United States) Bjorn Fratangelo
June 11	USA F15 Futures (United States) Chico, United States; Hard $15,000	(United States) Devin Britton (United States) Jordan Cox; 6–7^{(6–8)}, 7–6^{(10–8)}, [10–7]	(New Zealand) Daniel King-Turner (Australia) Nima Roshan	(South Africa) Fritz Wolmarans (Japan) Kento Takeuchi	(United States) Tennys Sandgren (United States) Devin Britton (United States) Joshua Zavala (United States) Bjorn Fratangelo
June 18	Argentina F14 Futures; Corrientes, Argentina; Clay $10,000	(Argentina) Diego Schwartzman; 6–2, 7–5	(Argentina) Facundo Argüello	(Argentina) Guido Andreozzi (Argentina) Sebastián Decoud	(Argentina) Guillermo Durán (Argentina) Juan-Martín Aranguren (Argentina) Leandro Migani (Argentina) Andrés Molteni
June 18	Argentina F14 Futures; Corrientes, Argentina; Clay $10,000	(Argentina) Andrés Molteni (Argentina) Juan Vázquez-Valenzuela; 6–1, 6–4	(Argentina) Leandro Migani (Argentina) Benjamin Tenti	(Argentina) Guido Andreozzi (Argentina) Sebastián Decoud	(Argentina) Guillermo Durán (Argentina) Juan-Martín Aranguren (Argentina) Leandro Migani (Argentina) Andrés Molteni
June 18	Brazil F14 Futures; Fortaleza, Brazil; Clay $10,000	(Brazil) Leonardo Kirche; 6–4, 6–7^{(5–7)}, 7–5	(Brazil) Fabrício Neis	(Sweden) Christian Lindell (Brazil) André Miele	(Brazil) João Pedro Sorgi (Brazil) Thales Turini (Brazil) Carlos Eduardo Severino (Brazil) Henrique Cunha
June 18	Brazil F14 Futures; Fortaleza, Brazil; Clay $10,000	(Brazil) André Miele (Brazil) Fabrício Neis; 6–3, 6–7^{(3–7)}, [10–7]	(Argentina) Maximiliano Estévez (Brazil) Leonardo Kirche	(Sweden) Christian Lindell (Brazil) André Miele	(Brazil) João Pedro Sorgi (Brazil) Thales Turini (Brazil) Carlos Eduardo Severino (Brazil) Henrique Cunha
June 18	China F9 Futures; Shenyang, China; Hard $15,000	(China) Li Zhe; 1–6, 7–6^{(7–3)}, 6–3	(China) Wu Di	(Chinese Taipei) Chen Ti (South Korea) Lim Yong-kyu	(China) Gong Maoxin (Australia) Matthew Barton (China) Chang Yu (Chinese Taipei) Huang Liang-chi
June 18	China F9 Futures; Shenyang, China; Hard $15,000	(Chinese Taipei) Huang Liang-chi (Chinese Taipei) Yi Chu-huan; 7–6^{(7–1)}, 7–5	(China) Gao Peng (China) Wu Di	(Chinese Taipei) Chen Ti (South Korea) Lim Yong-kyu	(China) Gong Maoxin (Australia) Matthew Barton (China) Chang Yu (Chinese Taipei) Huang Liang-chi
June 18	France F10 Futures; Blois, France; Clay $15,000+H	(France) Laurent Rochette; 7–6^{(7–2)}, 6–4	(United States) Daniel Kosakowski	(France) Jonathan Eysseric (France) Nicolas Renavand	(France) Quentin Halys (Czech Republic) Jan Minář (United States) Blake Strode (France) Alexis Musialek
June 18	France F10 Futures; Blois, France; Clay $15,000+H	(France) Émilien Firmin (France) Laurent Rochette; 6–7^{(8–10)}, 7–6^{(7–5)}, [10–7]	(United States) Adham El-Effendi (United Kingdom) Darren Walsh	(France) Jonathan Eysseric (France) Nicolas Renavand	(France) Quentin Halys (Czech Republic) Jan Minář (United States) Blake Strode (France) Alexis Musialek
June 18	Germany F6 Futures; Cologne, Germany; Clay $10,000	(Germany) Jan-Lennard Struff; 7–6^{(7–4)}, 7–5	(Germany) Jeremy Jahn	(Germany) Jean-Marc Werner (Finland) Timo Nieminen	(Belarus) Dzmitry Zhyrmont (Australia) Alex Bolt (Belgium) Germain Gigounon (Germany) Dennis Blömke
June 18	Germany F6 Futures; Cologne, Germany; Clay $10,000	(Australia) Alex Bolt (Australia) Andrew Whittington; 6–1, 6–0	(Germany) Jan-Lennard Struff (Germany) Mattis Wetzel	(Germany) Jean-Marc Werner (Finland) Timo Nieminen	(Belarus) Dzmitry Zhyrmont (Australia) Alex Bolt (Belgium) Germain Gigounon (Germany) Dennis Blömke
June 18	Italy F14 Futures; Busto Arsizio, Italy; Clay $15,000	(Romania) Petru-Alexandru Luncanu; 6–4, 7–6^{(8–6)}	(Serbia) Boris Pašanski	(Bosnia and Herzegovina) Mirza Bašić (Italy) Roberto Marcora	(Germany) Moritz Baumann (Austria) Nikolaus Moser (Italy) Riccardo Sinicropi (Italy) Filippo Leonardi
June 18	Italy F14 Futures; Busto Arsizio, Italy; Clay $15,000	(Italy) Stefano Ianni (Italy) Walter Trusendi; 6–3, 6–3	(Italy) Antonio Comporto (Serbia) Boris Pašanski	(Bosnia and Herzegovina) Mirza Bašić (Italy) Roberto Marcora	(Germany) Moritz Baumann (Austria) Nikolaus Moser (Italy) Riccardo Sinicropi (Italy) Filippo Leonardi
June 18	Japan F6 Futures; Tokyo-Akishima, Japan; Grass $10,000	(Japan) Hiroki Kondo; 6–2, 7–6^{(7–3)}	(Japan) Hiroyasu Ehara	(Japan) Shota Tagawa (Japan) Shuichi Sekiguchi	(Chinese Taipei) Peng Hsien-yin (Japan) Takuto Niki (Japan) Bumpei Sato (Japan) Yasutaka Uchiyama
June 18	Japan F6 Futures; Tokyo-Akishima, Japan; Grass $10,000	(Japan) Shota Tagawa (Japan) Yasutaka Uchiyama; 6–3, 6–3	(Japan) Yuuya Kibi (Japan) Yusuke Watanuki	(Japan) Shota Tagawa (Japan) Shuichi Sekiguchi	(Chinese Taipei) Peng Hsien-yin (Japan) Takuto Niki (Japan) Bumpei Sato (Japan) Yasutaka Uchiyama
June 18	Netherlands F2 Futures; Alkmaar, Netherlands; Clay $15,000	(Netherlands) Thiemo de Bakker; 6–4, 7–5	(Austria) Gerald Melzer	(Netherlands) Boy Westerhof (Belgium) Arthur De Greef	(France) Alexandre Sidorenko (Belgium) Alexandre Folie (Belgium) Yannik Reuter (Brazil) Tiago Fernandes
June 18	Netherlands F2 Futures; Alkmaar, Netherlands; Clay $15,000	(Sweden) Patrik Rosenholm (Sweden) Michael Ryderstedt; 6–2, 6–4	(Netherlands) Romano Frantzen (Netherlands) Wesley Koolhof	(Netherlands) Boy Westerhof (Belgium) Arthur De Greef	(France) Alexandre Sidorenko (Belgium) Alexandre Folie (Belgium) Yannik Reuter (Brazil) Tiago Fernandes
June 18	Peru F5 Futures; Trujillo, Peru; Clay $10,000	(Chile) Jorge Aguilar; 6–3, 5–7, 6–4	(Ecuador) Julio César Campozano	(Peru) Duilio Beretta (Brazil) Marcelo Demoliner	(Brazil) Nicolas Santos (Dominican Republic) José Hernández (El Salvador) Marcelo Arévalo (Brazil) Filipe Brandao
June 18	Peru F5 Futures; Trujillo, Peru; Clay $10,000	(Chile) Jorge Aguilar (Ecuador) Julio César Campozano; 6–4, 3–6, [10–6]	(El Salvador) Marcelo Arévalo (Brazil) Marcelo Demoliner	(Peru) Duilio Beretta (Brazil) Marcelo Demoliner	(Brazil) Nicolas Santos (Dominican Republic) José Hernández (El Salvador) Marcelo Arévalo (Brazil) Filipe Brandao
June 18	Russia F8 Futures; Kazan, Russia; Clay $15,000	(Russia) Nikoloz Basilashvili; 6–4, 7–6^{(7–3)}	(Ukraine) Ivan Sergeyev	(Russia) Valery Rudnev (Russia) Aslan Karatsev	(Russia) Alexander Pavlioutchenkov (Ukraine) Oleksandr Nedovyesov (Russia) Ivan Nedelko (Russia) Andrey Kumantsov
June 18	Russia F8 Futures; Kazan, Russia; Clay $15,000	(Ukraine) Oleksandr Nedovyesov (Ukraine) Ivan Sergeyev; 6–2, 6–4	(Russia) Aleksandr Lobkov (Russia) Alexander Rumyantsev	(Russia) Valery Rudnev (Russia) Aslan Karatsev	(Russia) Alexander Pavlioutchenkov (Ukraine) Oleksandr Nedovyesov (Russia) Ivan Nedelko (Russia) Andrey Kumantsov
June 18	Serbia F2 Futures; Belgrade, Serbia; Clay $10,000	(Hungary) Attila Balázs; 6–2, 6–2	(Serbia) Danilo Petrović	(Montenegro) Goran Tošić (Bosnia and Herzegovina) Aldin Šetkić	(Argentina) Valentín Florez (Croatia) Duje Kekez (Croatia) Mislav Hižak (France) Axel Michon
June 18	Serbia F2 Futures; Belgrade, Serbia; Clay $10,000	(Serbia) Nikola Ćaćić (Montenegro) Goran Tošić; 6–2, 6–4	(Spain) Juan Lizariturry (Spain) Enrique López Pérez	(Montenegro) Goran Tošić (Bosnia and Herzegovina) Aldin Šetkić	(Argentina) Valentín Florez (Croatia) Duje Kekez (Croatia) Mislav Hižak (France) Axel Michon
June 18	Spain F17 Futures; Melilla, Spain; Hard $10,000	(Republic of Ireland) James McGee; 6–3, 7–5	(Egypt) Mohamed Safwat	(Spain) Roberto Ortega Olmedo (Australia) Michael Look	(Spain) Andrés Artuñedo (Spain) Sergio Magro Moreno (Spain) Iván Arenas-Gualda (France) Rudy Coco
June 18	Spain F17 Futures; Melilla, Spain; Hard $10,000	(Spain) Iván Arenas-Gualda (Spain) Jaime Pulgar-García; 6–7^{(6–8)}, 6–1, [10–7]	(France) Jules Marie (France) Hugo Nys	(Spain) Roberto Ortega Olmedo (Australia) Michael Look	(Spain) Andrés Artuñedo (Spain) Sergio Magro Moreno (Spain) Iván Arenas-Gualda (France) Rudy Coco
June 18	Turkey F24 Futures; İzmir, Turkey; Clay $10,000	(Austria) Michael Linzer; 6–3, 6–1	(France) Yannick Jankovits	(Slovakia) Norbert Gombos (Morocco) Mehdi Ziadi	(United Kingdom) Richard Gabb (Slovakia) Filip Horanský (Germany) Peter Heller (Georgia (country)) Aleksandre Metreveli
June 18	Turkey F24 Futures; İzmir, Turkey; Clay $10,000	(Slovakia) Adrian Partl (Czech Republic) Michal Schmid; 6–4, 6–2	(France) Constantin Belot (France) Yannick Jankovits	(Slovakia) Norbert Gombos (Morocco) Mehdi Ziadi	(United Kingdom) Richard Gabb (Slovakia) Filip Horanský (Germany) Peter Heller (Georgia (country)) Aleksandre Metreveli
June 18	USA F16 Futures (United States) Indian Harbour Beach, United States; Clay $10,000	(United States) Chase Buchanan; 6–3, 6–4	(United States) Alexander Domijan	(United States) Christian Harrison (United States) Bjorn Fratangelo	(Slovenia) Blaž Rola (United States) Joshua Zavala (United States) Michael Redlicki (Philippines) Ruben Gonzales
June 18	USA F16 Futures (United States) Indian Harbour Beach, United States; Clay $10,000	(Philippines) Ruben Gonzales (Barbados) Darian King; 6–2, 3–6, [10–4]	(United States) Kevin King (Colombia) Juan Carlos Spir	(United States) Christian Harrison (United States) Bjorn Fratangelo	(Slovenia) Blaž Rola (United States) Joshua Zavala (United States) Michael Redlicki (Philippines) Ruben Gonzales
June 25	Argentina F15 Futures; Resistencia, Argentina; Clay $10,000	(Argentina) Guido Andreozzi; 6–0, 6–1	(Argentina) Andrés Molteni	(Argentina) Hernán Casanova (Argentina) Martín Ríos-Benítez	(Argentina) Gustavo Sterin (Argentina) Juan Pablo Ortiz (Argentina) Santiago Maccio (Argentina) Juan Vázquez-Valenzuela
June 25	Argentina F15 Futures; Resistencia, Argentina; Clay $10,000	(Argentina) Andrés Molteni (Argentina) Juan Vázquez-Valenzuela; 6–4, 4–6, [10–5]	(Argentina) Federico Coria (Argentina) Gabriel Alejandro Hidalgo	(Argentina) Hernán Casanova (Argentina) Martín Ríos-Benítez	(Argentina) Gustavo Sterin (Argentina) Juan Pablo Ortiz (Argentina) Santiago Maccio (Argentina) Juan Vázquez-Valenzuela
June 25	Belgium F1 Futures; De Haan, Belgium; Clay $10,000	(Belgium) Niels Desein; 6–2, 4–6, 6–3	(Belgium) Arthur De Greef	(Japan) Taro Daniel (Belgium) Germain Gigounon	(Egypt) Sherif Sabry (Venezuela) Ricardo Rodríguez (Chile) Juan Carlos Sáez (Belgium) Alexandre Folie
June 25	Belgium F1 Futures; De Haan, Belgium; Clay $10,000	(Belgium) Joris De Loore (Belgium) Yannick Vandenbulcke; 6–3, 2–6, [10–7]	(Belgium) Alexandre Folie (Belgium) Germain Gigounon	(Japan) Taro Daniel (Belgium) Germain Gigounon	(Egypt) Sherif Sabry (Venezuela) Ricardo Rodríguez (Chile) Juan Carlos Sáez (Belgium) Alexandre Folie
June 25	Brazil F15 Futures; Divinópolis, Brazil; Clay $10,000	(Argentina) Maximiliano Estévez; 6–3, 6–2	(Brazil) Leonardo Kirche	(Brazil) Fabrício Neis (Brazil) Thales Turini	(Brazil) João Pedro Sorgi (Brazil) Caio Silva (Brazil) Augusto Laranja (Brazil) Alexandre Schnitman
June 25	Brazil F15 Futures; Divinópolis, Brazil; Clay $10,000	(Brazil) Daniel Dutra da Silva (Brazil) Caio Silva; 6–2, 6–2	(Brazil) Alex Blumenberg (Brazil) Eduardo Dischinger	(Brazil) Fabrício Neis (Brazil) Thales Turini	(Brazil) João Pedro Sorgi (Brazil) Caio Silva (Brazil) Augusto Laranja (Brazil) Alexandre Schnitman
June 25	China F10 Futures; Shenyang, China; Hard $15,000	(China) Gong Maoxin; 6–4, 6–3	(China) Wu Di	(China) Li Zhe (South Korea) Kim Young-jun	(Chinese Taipei) Chen Ti (Chinese Taipei) Huang Liang-chi (United States) Sekou Bangoura (South Korea) Seo Yong-bum
June 25	China F10 Futures; Shenyang, China; Hard $15,000	(China) Gao Xin (China) Li Zhe; 6–4, 7–5	(Chinese Taipei) Huang Liang-chi (Chinese Taipei) Yi Chu-huan	(China) Li Zhe (South Korea) Kim Young-jun	(Chinese Taipei) Chen Ti (Chinese Taipei) Huang Liang-chi (United States) Sekou Bangoura (South Korea) Seo Yong-bum
June 25	France F11 Futures; Toulon, France; Clay $15,000	(France) David Guez; 6–4, 6–4	(France) Jonathan Eysseric	(France) Olivier Patience (France) Nicolas Renavand	(France) Laurent Rochette (France) Jérôme Inzerillo (France) Tristan Lamasine (France) Florian Reynet
June 25	France F11 Futures; Toulon, France; Clay $15,000	(France) Olivier Patience (France) Nicolas Renavand; 6–3, 4–6, [10–8]	(France) Grégoire Barrère (France) Lucas Pouille	(France) Olivier Patience (France) Nicolas Renavand	(France) Laurent Rochette (France) Jérôme Inzerillo (France) Tristan Lamasine (France) Florian Reynet
June 25	Germany F7 Futures; Römerberg, Germany; Clay $10,000	(Kazakhstan) Evgeny Korolev; 6–2, 6–2	(Germany) Bastian Knittel	(Germany) Jeremy Jahn (France) Pierre-Hugues Herbert	(Czech Republic) Roman Jebavý (Germany) Oscar Otte (Germany) Marc Sieber (Austria) Marc Rath
June 25	Germany F7 Futures; Römerberg, Germany; Clay $10,000	(India) Sriram Balaji (India) Vijay Sundar Prashanth; 7–5, 6–4	(Austria) Lukas Jastraunig (Austria) Marc Rath	(Germany) Jeremy Jahn (France) Pierre-Hugues Herbert	(Czech Republic) Roman Jebavý (Germany) Oscar Otte (Germany) Marc Sieber (Austria) Marc Rath
June 25	Indonesia F1 Futures; Jakarta, Indonesia; Hard $15,000	(Indonesia) Christopher Rungkat; 7–6^{(7–5)}, 6–1	(South Korea) Nam Ji-sung	(India) Jeevan Nedunchezhiyan (South Korea) Choi Dong-whee	(Thailand) Wishaya Trongcharoenchaikul (Japan) Kento Takeuchi (Indonesia) Sunu Wahyu Trijati (Indonesia) Elbert Sie
June 25	Indonesia F1 Futures; Jakarta, Indonesia; Hard $15,000	(Indonesia) Christopher Rungkat (Indonesia) Elbert Sie; 4–6, 7–5, [10–3]	(South Korea) Kim Cheong-eui (South Korea) Oh Dae-soung	(India) Jeevan Nedunchezhiyan (South Korea) Choi Dong-whee	(Thailand) Wishaya Trongcharoenchaikul (Japan) Kento Takeuchi (Indonesia) Sunu Wahyu Trijati (Indonesia) Elbert Sie
June 25	Italy F15 Futures; Viterbo, Italy; Clay $10,000	(Slovakia) Jozef Kovalík; 6–2, 4–6, 6–2	(Italy) Riccardo Bellotti	(Italy) Alessandro Bega (Italy) Claudio Fortuna	(Colombia) Óscar Rodríguez (Italy) Marco Bortolotti (Italy) Marco Cecchinato (Italy) Viktor Galović
June 25	Italy F15 Futures; Viterbo, Italy; Clay $10,000	(Greece) Theodoros Angelinos (Greece) Paris Gemouchidis; 6–4, 6–3	(Italy) Damiano di Ienno (Italy) Marco Stancati	(Italy) Alessandro Bega (Italy) Claudio Fortuna	(Colombia) Óscar Rodríguez (Italy) Marco Bortolotti (Italy) Marco Cecchinato (Italy) Viktor Galović
June 25	Japan F7 Futures; Sapporo, Japan; Clay $10,000	(South Korea) Nam Hyun-woo; 6–2, 6–1	(Japan) Yasutaka Uchiyama	(Japan) Gengo Kikuchi (Japan) Arata Onozawa	(Japan) Shunrou Takeshima (Japan) Shota Tagawa (Japan) Yuuya Kibi (Japan) Takao Suzuki
June 25	Japan F7 Futures; Sapporo, Japan; Clay $10,000	(Japan) Takuto Niki (Japan) Arata Onozawa; 7–6^{(7–3)}, 6–2	(Japan) Shota Tagawa (Japan) Yasutaka Uchiyama	(Japan) Gengo Kikuchi (Japan) Arata Onozawa	(Japan) Shunrou Takeshima (Japan) Shota Tagawa (Japan) Yuuya Kibi (Japan) Takao Suzuki
June 25	Netherlands F3 Futures; Breda, Netherlands; Clay $15,000+H	(China) Zhang Ze; 6–4, 3–6, 6–4	(Netherlands) Thiemo de Bakker	(Netherlands) Matwé Middelkoop (Germany) Jan-Lennard Struff	(Belgium) Maxime Authom (Netherlands) Nick van der Meer (Bulgaria) Alexandar Lazov (Netherlands) Boy Westerhof
June 25	Netherlands F3 Futures; Breda, Netherlands; Clay $15,000+H	(Netherlands) Matwé Middelkoop (Netherlands) Miliaan Niesten; 6–2, 6–4	(Germany) Patrick Pradella (Germany) Jan-Lennard Struff	(Netherlands) Matwé Middelkoop (Germany) Jan-Lennard Struff	(Belgium) Maxime Authom (Netherlands) Nick van der Meer (Bulgaria) Alexandar Lazov (Netherlands) Boy Westerhof
June 25	Peru F6 Futures; Lima, Peru; Clay $10,000	(Peru) Duilio Beretta; 5–7, 6–3, 7–5	(Chile) Jorge Aguilar	(Dominican Republic) José Hernández (Argentina) Renzo Olivo	(Brazil) Nicolas Santos (Ecuador) Julio César Campozano (Argentina) Facundo Mena (Peru) Mauricio Echazú
June 25	Peru F6 Futures; Lima, Peru; Clay $10,000	(Brazil) Marcelo Demoliner (Argentina) Renzo Olivo; 6–4, 6–3	(Peru) Duilio Beretta (Peru) Sergio Galdós	(Dominican Republic) José Hernández (Argentina) Renzo Olivo	(Brazil) Nicolas Santos (Ecuador) Julio César Campozano (Argentina) Facundo Mena (Peru) Mauricio Echazú
June 25	Romania F4 Futures; Sibiu, Romania; Clay $15,000	(Spain) Marc Giner; 6–3, 2–6, 6–0	(Croatia) Nikola Mektić	(France) Axel Michon (United States) Denis Zivkovic	(Croatia) Toni Androić (Montenegro) Goran Tošić (Moldova) Maxim Dubarenco (Croatia) Dino Marcan
June 25	Romania F4 Futures; Sibiu, Romania; Clay $15,000	(Romania) Cătălin-Ionuț Gârd (Romania) Petru-Alexandru Luncanu; 7–5, 6–4	(Croatia) Toni Androić (Croatia) Marin Bradarić	(France) Axel Michon (United States) Denis Zivkovic	(Croatia) Toni Androić (Montenegro) Goran Tošić (Moldova) Maxim Dubarenco (Croatia) Dino Marcan
June 25	Russia F9 Futures; Kazan, Russia; Clay $15,000	(Russia) Andrey Kumantsov; 6–3, 3–6, 6–4	(Ukraine) Ivan Sergeyev	(Russia) Alexander Rumyantsev (Belarus) Andrei Vasilevski	(Russia) Ivan Nedelko (Belarus) Egor Gerasimov (Russia) Mikhail Fufygin (Russia) Stanislav Vovk
June 25	Russia F9 Futures; Kazan, Russia; Clay $15,000	(Belarus) Egor Gerasimov (Belarus) Andrei Vasilevski; 6–4, 6–4	(Russia) Ivan Nedelko (Russia) Anton Zaitcev	(Russia) Alexander Rumyantsev (Belarus) Andrei Vasilevski	(Russia) Ivan Nedelko (Belarus) Egor Gerasimov (Russia) Mikhail Fufygin (Russia) Stanislav Vovk
June 25	Serbia F3 Futures; Belgrade, Serbia; Clay $10,000	(Serbia) Danilo Petrović; 6–3, 6–0	(Austria) Maximilian Neuchrist	(Bosnia and Herzegovina) Aldin Šetkić (Serbia) Nikola Bubnić	(Austria) Nicolas Reissig (Switzerland) Henri Laaksonen (Croatia) Kristijan Mesaroš (Serbia) Ivan Bjelica
June 25	Serbia F3 Futures; Belgrade, Serbia; Clay $10,000	(Serbia) Ivan Bjelica (Croatia) Matej Sabanov; 6–4, 6–1	(Austria) Maximilian Neuchrist (Austria) Nicolas Reissig	(Bosnia and Herzegovina) Aldin Šetkić (Serbia) Nikola Bubnić	(Austria) Nicolas Reissig (Switzerland) Henri Laaksonen (Croatia) Kristijan Mesaroš (Serbia) Ivan Bjelica
June 25	Spain F18 Futures; Palma del Río, Spain; Hard $15,000+H	(Spain) Arnau Brugués Davi; 6–1, 6–1	(United Kingdom) Joshua Milton	(Spain) Gerard Granollers Pujol (Egypt) Mohamed Safwat	(France) Jules Marie (Republic of Ireland) James McGee (Australia) Michael Look (France) Fabrice Martin
June 25	Spain F18 Futures; Palma del Río, Spain; Hard $15,000+H	(Republic of Ireland) James Cluskey (France) Fabrice Martin; 6–3, 6–4	(Spain) Gerard Granollers Pujol (Spain) Andoni Vivanco-Guzmán	(Spain) Gerard Granollers Pujol (Egypt) Mohamed Safwat	(France) Jules Marie (Republic of Ireland) James McGee (Australia) Michael Look (France) Fabrice Martin
June 25	Turkey F25 Futures; İzmir, Turkey; Clay $10,000	(Italy) Lorenzo Giustino; 6–4, 3–6, 7–5	(Australia) Jason Kubler	(Germany) Peter Heller (Croatia) Mate Delić	(Austria) Michael Linzer (Slovakia) Norbert Gombos (Austria) Thomas Statzberger (Israel) Yuriy Kovalenko
June 25	Turkey F25 Futures; İzmir, Turkey; Clay $10,000	(Germany) Peter Heller (Portugal) Gonçalo Pereira; 3–6, 6–2, [10–5]	(Turkey) Tuna Altuna (Russia) Sergei Krotiouk	(Germany) Peter Heller (Croatia) Mate Delić	(Austria) Michael Linzer (Slovakia) Norbert Gombos (Austria) Thomas Statzberger (Israel) Yuriy Kovalenko
June 25	USA F17 Futures (United States) Innisbrook, United States; Clay $10,000	(Slovenia) Blaž Rola; 6–2, 6–1	(Venezuela) Luis David Martínez	(United Kingdom) Alex Bogdanovic (United States) Chase Buchanan	(Australia) Greg Jones (United States) Bjorn Fratangelo (United States) Jordan Cox (United States) Dennis Nevolo
June 25	USA F17 Futures (United States) Innisbrook, United States; Clay $10,000	(United States) Chase Buchanan (Slovenia) Blaž Rola; 6–4, 6–2	(South Africa) Keith-Patrick Crowley (United States) Joshua Zavala	(United Kingdom) Alex Bogdanovic (United States) Chase Buchanan	(Australia) Greg Jones (United States) Bjorn Fratangelo (United States) Jordan Cox (United States) Dennis Nevolo
