= Sebastián Quintero =

Colombian tennis player

- Country (sports): Colombia
- Born: 4 June 1983 (age 41)
- Plays: Right-handed
- Prize money: $13,252

Singles
- Highest ranking: No. 751 (24 May 2004)

Doubles
- Highest ranking: No. 546 (11 Oct 2004)

Sebastián Quintero (born 4 June 1983) is a Colombian former professional tennis player.

Quintero, a Colombian Davis Cup squad member, spent his professional career competing mostly in ITF Futures tournaments. Amongst his occasional ATP Challenger appearances he won a doubles title at the Bancolombia Open in 2004. He reached career best rankings of 751 for singles and 546 for doubles.

== ATP Challenger titles ==
=== Doubles: (1) ===
No.	Date	Tournament	Surface	Partner	Opponents	Score
1.	Mar 2004	Bancolombia Open, Bogotá, Colombia	Clay	(Colombia) Óscar Rodríguez	(Argentina) Gustavo Marcaccio (Argentina) Diego Veronelli	6–3, 6–4
