= Óscar Rodríguez (tennis) =

Colombian tennis player

- Full name: Óscar Rodríguez-Sánchez
- Country (sports): Colombia
- Born: 7 October 1984 (age 40); Bogotá, Colombia
- Plays: Right-handed
- Prize money: $19,020

Singles
- Highest ranking: No. 727 (17 May 2004)

Doubles
- Highest ranking: No. 554 (11 Oct 2004)

Óscar Rodríguez-Sánchez (born 7 October 1984) is a Colombian former professional tennis player.

Born in Bogotá, Rodríguez's career included an appearance in a home Davis Cup tie against Brazil in 2005, losing to André Sá in the reverse singles. His biggest title win on the professional tour was in doubles at a Bogotá Challenger tournament in 2004. He reached career best rankings of 727 in singles and 554 in doubles.

== Challenger/Futures titles ==
Legend
ATP Challenger (1)
ITF Futures (1)

=== Doubles ===
No.	Date	Tournament	Tier	Surface	Partner	Opponents	Score
1.	Mar 2004	Bancolombia Open, Bogotá, Colombia	Challenger	Clay	(Colombia) Sebastián Quintero	(Argentina) Gustavo Marcaccio (Argentina) Diego Veronelli	6–3, 6–4
2.	Jul 2012	Italy F20, La Spezia	Futures	Clay	(Colombia) Cristian Rodríguez	(Colombia) Alejandro González (Portugal) Pedro Sousa	7–6^{(1)}, 6–4
