= 2010 ITF Men's Circuit =

Composition

Details

Achievements (singles)

The 2010 ITF Men's Circuit consisted of 502 'Futures' tournaments played year round, around the world.

== Events ==
Tournament	Date	City	Country	Surface	Singles champions	Doubles champions
Germany F1 Futures	January 11	Schwieberdingen	Germany	Carpet (i)	(Netherlands) Jesse Huta Galung	(Netherlands) Jesse Huta Galung / (Netherlands) Miliaan Niesten
Great Britain F1 Futures	January 11	Glasgow	United Kingdom	Hard (i)	(United Kingdom) Chris Eaton	(United Kingdom) Chris Eaton / (United Kingdom) Dominic Inglot
Spain F1 Futures	January 11	Ciutadella	Spain	Clay	(Italy) Francesco Aldi	(Spain) José Antonio Sánchez de Luna / (Spain) Ignacio Coll Riudavets
USA F1 Futures	January 11	Plantation, Florida	United States	Clay	(France) Benoît Paire	(Italy) Stefano Ianni / (Latvia) Deniss Pavlovs
El Salvador F1 Futures	January 18	Santa Tecla	El Salvador	Clay	(Croatia) Borut Puc	(Ecuador) Emilio Gómez / (Ecuador) Julio César Campozano
Germany F2 Futures	January 18	Stuttgart	Germany	Hard (i)	(Germany) Bastian Knittel	(Germany) Kevin Deden / (Germany) Bastian Knittel
Great Britain F2 Futures	January 18	Sheffield	United Kingdom	Hard (i)	(Italy) Stefano Galvani	(France) Oliver Charroin / (Latvia) Andis Juška
Spain F2 Futures	January 18	Cala Millor	Spain	Clay	(Hungary) Attila Balázs	(Spain) José Antonio Sánchez de Luna / (Spain) Ignacio Coll Riudavets
USA F2 Futures	January 18	Hollywood	United States	Clay	(France) Éric Prodon	(Italy) Matteo Viola / (Italy) Stefano Ianni
Argentina F1 Futures	January 25	Dolores	Argentina	Clay	(Argentina) Jonathan Gonzalia	(Argentina) Diego Cristín / (Argentina) Andrés Molteni
France F1 Futures	January 25	Bagnoles-de-l'Orne	France	Clay (i)	(France) Grégoire Burquier	(France) Florian Reynet / (France) Morgan Mannarino
Germany F3 Futures	January 25	Kaarst	Germany	Carpet (i)	(Ukraine) Sergey Bubka	(Luxembourg) Mike Scheidweiler / (France) Ludovic Walter
Guatemala F1 Futures	January 25	Guatemala City	Guatemala	Hard	(Romania) Marius Copil	(Romania) Marius Copil / (Ecuador) Iván Endara
Israel F1 Futures	January 25	Eilat	Israel	Hard	(Slovakia) Andrej Martin	(Slovakia) Andrej Martin / (Slovakia) Miloslav Mečíř Jr.
Morocco F1 Futures	January 25	Casablanca	Morocco	Clay	(Slovakia) Martin Kližan	(Italy) Simone Vagnozzi / (Italy) Alberto Brizzi
Spain F3 Futures	January 25	Murcia	Spain	Hard	(Spain) Roberto Bautista Agut	(France) Fabrice Martin / (France) Jérémy Blandin
USA F3 Futures	January 25	Tamarac, Florida	United States	Clay	(France) Éric Prodon	(Romania) Cătălin Gârd / (United States) Christian Guevara
Argentina F2 Futures	February 1	Tandil	Argentina	Clay	(Argentina) Juan-Manuel Valverde	(Argentina) Martín Alund / (Italy) Daniel-Alejandro Lopez
Egypt F1 Futures	February 1	Giza	Egypt	Clay	(Czech Republic) Jaroslav Pospíšil	(Spain) Gerard Granollers Pujol / (Germany) Denis Gremelmayr
France F2 Futures	February 1	Feucherolles	France	Hard (i)	(France) Charles-Antoine Brézac	(France) Oliver Charroin / (Latvia) Andis Juška
Germany F4 Futures	February 1	Nussloch	Germany	Carpet (i)	(Belgium) Niels Desein	(Czech Republic) Daniel Lustig / (Czech Republic) Roman Jebavý
Israel F2 Futures	February 1	Eilat	Israel	Hard	(Slovakia) Andrej Martin	(United States) Cory Parr / (United States) Todd Paul
Marocco F2 Futures	February 1	Rabat	Morocco	Clay	(Algeria) Lamine Ouahab	(United States) Denis Zivkovic / (Serbia) David Savić
Panama F1 Futures	February 1	Panama City	Panama	Clay	(Mexico) César Ramírez	(Colombia) Eduardo Struvay / (Colombia) Juan Sebastián Cabal
Spain F4 Futures	February 1	Murcia	Spain	Clay	(Spain) Sergio Gutiérrez Ferrol	(Italy) Walter Trusendi / (Italy) Daniele Giorgini
USA F4 Futures	February 1	Palm Coast	United States	Clay	(Austria) Marco Mirnegg	(United States) Benjamin Rogers / (United States) Taylor Fogleman
Argentina F3 Futures	February 8	Mar del Plata	Argentina	Clay	(Argentina) Martín Alund	(Argentina) Andrés Molteni / (Argentina) Diego Cristín
Egypt F2 Futures	February 8	Giza	Egypt	Clay	(France) Éric Prodon	(Egypt) Sherif Sabry / (Egypt) Karim Maamoun
France F3 Futures	February 8	Bressuire	France	Hard (i)	(Latvia) Andis Juška	(France) Jérémy Blandin / (France) Fabrice Martin
Israel F3 Futures	February 8	Eilat	Israel	Hard	(Slovakia) Miloslav Mečíř Jr.	(Republic of Ireland) James Cluskey / (New Zealand) Michael Venus
Mexico F1 Futures	February 8	Mexico City	Mexico	Hard	(Spain) Arnau Brugués Davi	(Mexico) Daniel Garza / (Mexico) Bruno Rodríguez
Spain F5 Futures	February 8	Murcia	Spain	Clay	(Spain) Pedro Clar Rosselló	(Italy) Daniele Giorgini / (Italy) Walter Trusendi
Australia F1 Futures	February 15	Mildura	Australia	Grass	(New Zealand) Daniel King-Turner	(Australia) Matthew Ebden / (Australia) Samuel Groth
Azerbaijan F1 Futures	February 15	Baku	Azerbaijan	Hard (i)	(Sweden) Ervin Eleskovic	(Romania) Petru-Alexandru Luncanu / (Netherlands) Matwé Middelkoop
B&H F1 Futures	February 15	Sarajevo	(Bosnia and Herzegovina) Bosnia	Carpet (i)	(Poland) Dawid Olejniczak	(Austria) Philipp Oswald / (Austria) Alexander Peya
Egypt F3 Futures	February 15	Giza	Egypt	Clay	(Egypt) Karim Maamoun	(Spain) Guillermo Alcaide / (Spain) Gerard Granollers Pujol
Spain F6 Futures	February 15	Cartagena	Spain	Clay	(Spain) Gabriel Trujillo Soler	(United States) Conor Pollock / (Serbia) David Savić
USA F5 Futures	February 15	Brownsville, Texas	United States	Hard	(Dominican Republic) Víctor Estrella	(Spain) Arnau Brugués Davi / (Dominican Republic) Víctor Estrella
Australia F2 Futures	February 22	Berri	Australia	Grass	(Australia) John Millman	(Australia) Matthew Ebden / (Australia) Samuel Groth
Azerbaijan F2 Futures	February 22	Baku	Azerbaijan	Hard (i)	(Poland) Jerzy Janowicz	(Netherlands) Matwé Middelkoop / (Netherlands) Antal van der Duim
B&H F2 Futures	February 22	Sarajevo	(Bosnia and Herzegovina) Bosnia	Hard (i)	(Finland) Henri Kontinen	(United Kingdom) Chris Eaton / (United Kingdom) Dominic Inglot
USA F6 Futures	February 22	Harlingen, Texas	United States	Hard	(Spain) Arnau Brugués Davi	(Romania) Cătălin Gârd / (Russia) Artem Sitak
Canada F1 Futures	March 1	Gatineau	Canada	Hard (i)	(Sweden) Michael Ryderstedt	(Montenegro) Daniel Danilović / (Sweden) Michael Ryderstedt
Portugal F1 Futures	March 1	Faro	Portugal	Hard	(France) Benoît Paire	(France) Thomas Cazes-Carrère / (France) Benoît Paire
Spain F7 Futures	March 1	Terrassa	Spain	Clay	(Spain) Gabriel Trujillo Soler	(Spain) Carlos Rexach-Itoiz / (Spain) Gabriel Trujillo Soler
Turkey F1 Futures	March 1	Antalya	Turkey	Clay	(Netherlands) Jesse Huta Galung	(Austria) Marco Mirnegg / (Austria) Herbert Wiltschnig
USA F7 Futures	March 1	McAllen, Texas	United States	Hard	(Chinese Taipei) Chen Ti	(Georgia (country)) Nikoloz Basilashvili / (Russia) Artem Sitak
Canada F2 Futures	March 8	Montreal	Canada	Hard (i)	(Switzerland) Adrien Bossel	(United States) Cory Parr / (United States) Todd Paul
France F4 Futures	March 8	Lille	France	Hard (i)	(Belgium) Ruben Bemelmans	(Belgium) Ruben Bemelmans / (Belgium) Niels Desein
Great Britain F3 Futures	March 8	Tipton	United Kingdom	Hard (i)	(Spain) Roberto Bautista Agut	(Slovakia) Kamil Čapkovič / (Slovakia) Andrej Martin
Portugal F2 Futures	March 8	Lagos	Portugal	Hard	(Spain) Guillermo Alcaide	(Romania) Adrian Cruciat / (Romania) Victor Ioniță
Spain F8 Futures	March 8	Sabadell	Spain	Clay	(Spain) Gabriel Trujillo Soler	(Spain) Ignacio Coll Riudavets / (Spain) Gerard Granollers Pujol
Switzerland F1 Futures	March 8	Torricella-Taverne	Switzerland	Carpet (i)	(Italy) Luca Vanni	(Poland) Marcin Gawron / (Poland) Dawid Olejniczak
Turkey F2 Futures	March 8	Antalya	Turkey	Clay	(Italy) Thomas Fabbiano	(Ukraine) Stanislav Poplavskyy / (Ukraine) Artem Smirnov
Canada F3 Futures	March 15	Sherbrooke	Canada	Hard (i)	(Canada) Vasek Pospisil	(United States) Cory Parr / (United States) Todd Paul
China F1 Futures	March 15	Kaiyuan City	China	Hard (i)	(Italy) Riccardo Ghedin	(Australia) Sadik Kadir / (India) Purav Raja
Croatia F1 Futures	March 15	Poreč	Croatia	Clay	(Czech Republic) Jaroslav Pospíšil	(Spain) Carles Poch Gradin / (Italy) Matteo Viola
France F5 Futures	March 15	Poitiers	France	Hard (i)	(Belgium) Ruben Bemelmans	(Belgium) Ruben Bemelmans / (Belgium) Yannick Mertens
Great Britain F4 Futures	March 15	Bath	United Kingdom	Hard (i)	(Slovakia) Andrej Martin	(Slovakia) Kamil Čapkovič / (Slovakia) Andrej Martin
India F1 Futures	March 15	Kolkata	India	Clay	(United States) Nathan Thompson	(India) Vivek Shokeen / (India) Ashutosh Singh
Italy F1 Futures	March 15	Trento	Italy	Carpet (i)	(Austria) Johannes Ager	(Belarus) Nikolai Fidirko / (Austria) Nikolaus Moser
Japan F1 Futures	March 15	Tokyo	Japan	Hard	(Japan) Yuichi Ito	(Japan) Bumpei Sato / (Chinese Taipei) Yi Chu-huan
Kazakhstan F1 Futures	March 15	Astana	Kazakhstan	Hard (i)	(Russia) Alexander Kudryavtsev	(Russia) Evgeny Kirillov / (Russia) Alexander Kudryavtsev
Portugal F3 Futures	March 15	Albufeira	Portugal	Hard	(France) Benoît Paire	(Brazil) Diego Matos / (Brazil) André Miele
Switzerland F2 Futures	March 15	Wetzikon	Switzerland	Carpet (i)	(Netherlands) Matwé Middelkoop	(Germany) Kevin Krawietz / (Germany) Marcel Zimmermann
Spain F9 Futures	March 15	Badalona	Spain	Clay	(Spain) Gabriel Trujillo Soler	(Spain) Ignacio Coll Riudavets / (Spain) Gerard Granollers Pujol
Turkey F3 Futures	March 15	Antalya	Turkey	Clay	(Slovakia) Pavol Červenák	(Bulgaria) Tihomir Grozdanov / (Bulgaria) Ivaylo Traykov
China F2 Futures	March 22	Mengzi	China	Hard	(China) Zhang Ze	(Solomon Islands) Michael Leong / (Germany) Sebastian Rieschick
Croatia F2 Futures	March 22	Rovinj	Croatia	Clay	(Hungary) Attila Balázs	(Croatia) Marin Draganja / (Germany) Cedrik-Marcel Stebe
India F2 Futures	March 22	Chandigargh	India	Hard	(India) Karan Rastogi	(United States) Ruben Gonzales / (United States) Nathan Thompson
Italy F2 Futures	March 22	Rome	Italy	Clay	(Austria) Andreas Haider-Maurer	(Italy) Francesco Aldi / (Italy) Daniele Giorgini
Japan F2 Futures	March 22	Tokyo	Japan	Hard	(Japan) Go Soeda	(Japan) Tasuku Iwami / (Japan) Hiroki Kondo
Kazakhstan F2 Futures	March 22	Almaty	Kazakhstan	Hard (i)	(Russia) Andrey Kuznetsov	(Russia) Alexander Kudryavtsev / (Russia) Evgeny Kirillov
Spain F10 Futures	March 22	Zaragoza	Spain	Clay (i)	(Spain) Daniel Muñoz de la Nava	(Spain) Jordi Marse-Vidri / (Spain) Óscar Sabaté-Bretos
Switzerland F3 Futures	March 22	Vaduz	Liechtenstein	Carpet (i)	(Croatia) Ante Pavić	(France) Oliver Charroin / (Latvia) Andis Juška
Turkey F4 Futures	March 22	Antalya	Turkey	Clay	(Austria) Marco Mirnegg	(Czech Republic) Karel Tříska / (Czech Republic) Radim Urbánek
Croatia F3 Futures	March 29	Rovinj	Croatia	Clay	(Austria) Herbert Wiltschnig	(Croatia) Marin Draganja / (Germany) Cedrik-Marcel Stebe
India F3 Futures	March 29	Vijayawada	India	Hard	(India) Rupesh Roy	(India) Divij Sharan / (India) Vishnu Vardhan
Italy F3 Futures	March 29	Foggia	Italy	Clay	(Italy) Alessio di Mauro	(Italy) Alessio di Mauro / (Italy) Simone Vagnozzi
Japan F3 Futures	March 29	Kofu	Japan	Hard	(Japan) Go Soeda	(Japan) Tasuku Iwami / (Japan) Hiroki Kondo
Turkey F5 Futures	March 29	Antalya	Turkey	Clay	(France) Gianni Mina	(Spain) Ignacio Coll Riudavets / (Spain) Gerard Granollers Pujol
USA F8 Futures	March 29	Mobile, Alabama	United States	Hard	(Slovakia) Ivo Klec	(Australia) Brydan Klein / (Australia) John Millman
Brazil F1 Futures	April 5	Santa Maria	Brazil	Clay	(Uruguay) Marcel Felder	(Brazil) Gustavo Junqueira de Andrade / (Brazil) Thales Turini
China F3 Futures	April 5	Chongqing	China	Hard	(China) Wu Di	(China) Wu Di / (China) Zhang Ze
Japan F4 Futures	April 5	Tsukuba	Japan	Hard	(Japan) Yasutaka Uchiyama	(Japan) Tasuku Iwami / (Japan) Hiroki Moriya
Korea F1 Futures	April 5	Seogwipo	South Korea	Hard	(Finland) Harri Heliövaara	(South Korea) An Jae-sung / (South Korea) Lee Chul-hee
Spain F11 Futures	April 5	Madrid	Spain	Hard	(Spain) Pablo Carreño Busta	(France) Charles-Antoine Brézac / (France) Vincent Stouff
Turkey F6 Futures	April 5	Antalya	Turkey	Clay	(Austria) Marco Mirnegg	(Chile) Hans Podlipnik Castillo / (Chile) Ricardo Urzúa-Rivera
USA F9 Futures	April 5	Little Rock	United States	Hard	(Australia) Brydan Klein	(United States) Lester Cook / (United States) Brett Joelson
Brazil F2 Futures	April 12	Bauru	Brazil	Clay	(Brazil) José Pereira	(Venezuela) Miguel Cicenia / (Argentina) Maximiliano Estévez
China F4 Futures	April 12	Guiyang	China	Hard	(China) Li Zhe	(China) Gong Mao-Xin / (China) Li Zhe
France F6 Futures	April 12	Angers	France	Clay (i)	(France) Olivier Patience	(France) Charles-Antoine Brézac / (France) Vincent Stouff
Italy F4 Futures	April 12	Vercelli	Italy	Clay	(Netherlands) Thomas Schoorel	(Russia) Ilya Belyaev / (Russia) Andrey Kuznetsov
Korea F2 Futures	April 12	Daegu	South Korea	Hard	(Canada) Milos Raonic	(Australia) Adam Feeney / (Finland) Harri Heliövaara
Spain F12 Futures	April 12	Madrid	Spain	Clay	(Venezuela) David Souto	(Spain) Óscar Burrieza / (Spain) Javier Martí
Turkey F7 Futures	April 12	Adana	Turkey	Clay	(Estonia) Jürgen Zopp	(Germany) Kevin Krawietz / (Germany) Marcel Zimmermann
Brazil F3 Futures	April 19	Brasília	Brazil	Clay	(France) Jonathan Eysseric	(Brazil) Víctor Maynard / (Brazil) Nicolás Santos
France F7 Futures	April 19	Grasse	France	Clay	(France) Olivier Patience	(France) Olivier Charroin / (France) Vincent Stouff
Italy F5 Futures	April 19	Padova	Italy	Clay	(Germany) Cedrik-Marcel Stebe	(Denmark) Frederik Nielsen / (Italy) Federico Torresi
Korea F3 Futures	April 19	Changwon	South Korea	Hard	(United States) Jordan Cox	(Austria) Nikolaus Moser / (Austria) Max Raditschnigg
Spain F13 Futures	April 19	Reus	Spain	Clay	(France) Laurent Rochette	(Spain) Agustín Boje-Ordóñez / (Spain) Pablo Martín-Adalia
Turkey F8 Futures	April 19	Tarsus	Turkey	Clay	(Estonia) Jürgen Zopp	(Germany) Kevin Krawietz / (Germany) Marcel Zimmermann
Uzbekistan F1 Futures	April 19	Andijan	Uzbekistan	Hard	(Russia) Mikhail Elgin	(Russia) Alexander Kudryavtsev / (Ukraine) Denys Molchanov
Argentina F4 Futures	April 26	Buenos Aires	Argentina	Clay	(Argentina) Lionel Noviski	(Argentina) Facundo Argüello / (Argentina) Agustín Velotti
Australia F3 Futures	April 26	Ipswich	Australia	Clay	(Australia) Brydan Klein	(Australia) Brydan Klein / (Australia) Dane Propoggia
Brazil F4 Futures	April 26	Fortaleza	Brazil	Clay	(Uruguay) Marcel Felder	(Mexico) Luis Díaz Barriga / (Mexico) Miguel Ángel Reyes-Varela
Great Britain F5 Futures	April 26	Bournemouth	United Kingdom	Clay	(France) Éric Prodon	(Italy) Claudio Grassi / (Italy) Matteo Marrai
Italy F6 Futures	April 26	Vicenza	Italy	Clay	(Russia) Ilya Belyaev	(Italy) Nicola Remedi / (Italy) Andrea Stoppini
Korea F4 Futures	April 26	Gimcheon	South Korea	Hard	(Canada) Milos Raonic	(South Korea) An Jae-sung / (South Korea) Lim Yong-kyu
Mexico F2 Futures	April 26	Córdoba	Mexico	Hard	(Mexico) Santiago González	(Mexico) Santiago González / (Mexico) Carlos Palencia
Spain F14 Futures	April 26	Vic	Spain	Clay	(Spain) Sergio Gutiérrez Ferrol	(Spain) David Cañudas-Fernández / (Spain) Pablo Martín-Adalia
USA F10 Futures	April 26	Vero Beach	United States	Clay	(Latvia) Kārlis Lejnieks	(Germany) Gero Kretschmer / (Germany) Alex Satschko
Uzbekistan F2 Futures	April 26	Namangan	Uzbekistan	Hard	(Russia) Alexander Kudryavtsev	(Russia) Mikhail Elgin / (Kazakhstan) Alexey Kedryuk
Argentina F5 Futures	May 3	Buenos Aires	Argentina	Clay	(Argentina) Facundo Argüello	(Argentina) Renzo Olivo / (Argentina) Diego Schwartzman
Australia F4 Futures	May 3	Bundaberg	Australia	Clay	(Australia) Brydan Klein	(Australia) Brydan Klein / (Australia) Dane Propoggia
B&H F3 Futures	May 3	Bundaberg	(Bosnia and Herzegovina) Bosnia	Clay	(Czech Republic) Michal Schmid	(Austria) Michael Linzer / (Austria) Herbert Wiltschnig
Brazil F5 Futures	May 3	Teresina	Brazil	Clay	(Brazil) Franco Ferreiro	(Mexico) Luis Díaz Barriga / (Mexico) Miguel Ángel Reyes-Varela
Bulgaria F1 Futures	May 3	Varna	Bulgaria	Clay	(Romania) Adrian Cruciat	(Spain) Óscar Burrieza / (Spain) Javier Martí
Czech Republic F1 Futures	May 3	Teplice	Czech Republic	Clay	(Estonia) Jürgen Zopp	(Czech Republic) Jan Mertl / (Poland) Grzegorz Panfil
Great Britain F6 Futures	May 3	Edinburgh	United Kingdom	Clay	(United Kingdom) Alexander Slabinsky	(Republic of Ireland) James Cluskey / (Republic of Ireland) Colin O'Brien
India F4 Futures	May 3	Kolkata	India	Hard	(Uzbekistan) Murad Inoyatov	(India) Vivek Shokeen / (India) Ashutosh Singh
Italy F7 Futures	May 3	Viterbo	Italy	Clay	(Chile) Guillermo Hormazábal	(Chile) Guillermo Hormazábal / (Italy) Walter Trusendi
Mexico F3 Futures	May 3	Mexico City	Mexico	Hard	(Mexico) Miguel Gallardo Valles	(Mexico) César Ramírez / (Australia) Nima Roshan
Spain F15 Futures	May 3	Balaguer	Spain	Clay	(Canada) Steven Diez	(Spain) Jordi Marse-Vidri / (Spain) Pablo Martín-Adalia
USA F11 Futures	May 3	Orange Park, Florida	United States	Clay	(Italy) Matteo Viola	(United States) Andrea Collarini / (United States) Denis Kudla
Argentina F6 Futures	May 10	Buenos Aires	Argentina	Clay	(Argentina) Andrés Molteni	(Argentina) Diego Cristín / (Uruguay) Martín Cuevas
B&H F4 Futures	May 10	Sarajevo	(Bosnia and Herzegovina) Bosnia	Clay	(Czech Republic) Michal Schmid	(Serbia) Dušan Lajović / (Serbia) Miljan Zekić
Brazil F6 Futures	May 10	Caldas Novas	Brazil	Clay	(Brazil) Marcelo Demoliner	(Brazil) Franco Ferreiro / (Brazil) André Miele
Bulgaria F2 Futures	May 10	Varna	Bulgaria	Clay	(Spain) Javier Martí	(Romania) Adrian Cruciat / (Romania) Alexandru Carpen
Czech Republic F2 Futures	May 10	Most	Czech Republic	Clay	(Germany) Dennis Blömke	(Czech Republic) Roman Jebavý / (Russia) Andrey Kumantsov
Great Britain F7 Futures	May 10	Newcastle	United Kingdom	Clay	(France) Éric Prodon	(Spain) Ignacio Coll Riudavets / (Spain) Gerard Granollers Pujol
India F5 Futures	May 10	New Delhi	India	Hard	(South Africa) Rik de Voest	(China) Yu Xin-Juan / (India) Ranjeet Virali-Murugesan
Italy F8 Futures	May 10	Pozzuoli	Italy	Clay	(Italy) Alessio di Mauro	(Argentina) Juan-Martín Aranguren / (Argentina) Alejandro Fabbri
Mexico F4 Futures	May 10	Celaya	Mexico	Hard	(Mexico) Víctor Romero	(United States) Ashwin Kumar / (United States) Conor Pollock
Spain F16 Futures	May 10	Lleida	Spain	Clay	(Spain) Íñigo Cervantes Huegun	(Spain) Miguel Ángel López Jaén / (Australia) Allen Perel
USA F12 Futures	May 10	Tampa, Florida	United States	Clay	(France) Augustin Gensse	(United States) Denis Kudla / (United States) Junior A. Ore
B&H F5 Futures	May 17	Brčko	(Bosnia and Herzegovina) Bosnia	Clay	(Montenegro) Goran Tošić	(Serbia) Ivan Bjelica / (Serbia) Miljan Zekić
Brazil F7 Futures	May 17	Marilia	Brazil	Clay	(Brazil) Leonardo Kirche	(Brazil) Marcelo Demoliner / (Brazil) Rodrigo Guidolin
Bulgaria F3 Futures	May 17	Plovdiv	Bulgaria	Clay	(Bulgaria) Tihomir Grozdanov	(Bulgaria) Tihomir Grozdanov / (Bulgaria) Ivaylo Traykov
Czech Republic F3 Futures	May 17	Jablonec nad Nisou	Czech Republic	Clay	(Czech Republic) Jaroslav Pospíšil	(Czech Republic) Jan Hradský / (Czech Republic) Jan Šátral
Italy F9 Futures	May 17	Parma	Italy	Clay	(Italy) Daniele Giorgini	(Italy) Alberto Brizzi / (Italy) Giuseppe Montenet
Poland F1 Futures	May 17	Katowice	Poland	Clay	(Germany) Alexander Flock	(Chile) Adrián García / (Chile) Hans Podlipnik Castillo
Romania F1 Futures	May 17	Bucharest	Romania	Clay	(France) Florian Reynet	(Germany) Sascha Heinemann / (Germany) Marcel Zimmermann
South Africa F1 Futures	May 17	Durban	South Africa	Hard	(South Africa) Andrew Anderson	(Austria) Nikolaus Moser / (Austria) Max Raditschnigg
Spain F17 Futures	May 17	Valldoreix	Spain	Clay	(Portugal) João Sousa	(Spain) David Cañudas-Fernández / (Spain) Marc Fornell Mestres
B&H F6 Futures	May 24	Prijedor	(Bosnia and Herzegovina) Bosnia	Clay	(Croatia) Franko Škugor	(Croatia) Toni Androić / (Croatia) Franko Škugor
Brazil F8 Futures	May 24	Juiz de Fora	Brazil	Clay	(Brazil) Leonardo Kirche	(Mexico) Luis Díaz Barriga / (Mexico) Miguel Ángel Reyes-Varela
Italy F10 Futures	May 24	Cesena	Italy	Clay	(Denmark) Frederik Nielsen	(Argentina) Juan-Martín Aranguren / (Argentina) Alejandro Fabbri
Poland F2 Futures	May 24	Kraków	Poland	Clay	(Czech Republic) Dušan Lojda	(Poland) Marcin Gawron / (Poland) Andriej Kapaś
Romania F2 Futures	May 24	Ploiești	Romania	Clay	(Romania) Adrian Cruciat	(Moldova) Radu Albot / (Moldova) Andrei Ciumac
Slovenia F1 Futures	May 24	Kamnik	Slovenia	Clay	(Germany) Marcel Zimmermann	(Spain) Óscar Sabaté-Bretos / (Chile) Ricardo Urzúa-Rivera
South Africa F2 Futures	May 24	Durban	South Africa	Hard	(Austria) Nikolaus Moser	(South Africa) Raven Klaasen / (Austria) Richard Ruckelshausen
Spain F18 Futures	May 24	Adeje	Spain	Hard	(Portugal) João Sousa	(Spain) Georgi Rumenov Payakov / (Portugal) João Sousa
Argentina F7 Futures	May 31	Neuquén	Argentina	Clay	(Argentina) Andrés Molteni	(Argentina) Nicolás Jara-Lozano / (Argentina) Andrés Molteni
B&H F7 Futures	May 31	Kiseljak	(Bosnia and Herzegovina) Bosnia	Clay	(Bosnia and Herzegovina) Mirza Bašić	(Serbia) Miljan Zekić / (Serbia) Arsenije Zlatanović
Brazil F9 Futures	May 31	Araguari	Brazil	Clay	(Brazil) Daniel Dutra da Silva	(Brazil) Rodrigo Grilli / (Bolivia) Mauricio Doria-Medina
China F5 Futures	May 31	Wuhan	China	Hard	(Finland) Harri Heliövaara	(China) Li Zhe / (China) Gong Mao-Xin
Guam F1 Futures	May 31	Tumon	Guam	Hard	(Japan) Tatsuma Ito	(Japan) Tasuku Iwami / (Japan) Toshihide Matsui
Indonesia F1 Futures	May 31	Bandung	Indonesia	Hard	(South Korea) Kim Young-jun	(South Korea) An Jae-sung / (South Korea) Kim Young-jun
Italy F11 Futures	May 31	Bergamo	Italy	Clay	(Spain) Pedro Clar Rosselló	(Italy) Alessandro Giannessi / (Denmark) Frederik Nielsen
Poland F3 Futures	May 31	Koszalin	Poland	Clay	(Poland) Jerzy Janowicz	(Poland) Błażej Koniusz / (Poland) Grzegorz Panfil
Romania F3 Futures	May 31	Bacău	Romania	Clay	(France) Florian Reynet	(Ukraine) Ivan Anikanov / (Moldova) Roman Tudoreanu
Slovenia F2 Futures	May 31	Rogaška Slatina	Slovenia	Clay	(Croatia) Nikola Mektić	(Croatia) Nikola Mektić / (Croatia) Ivan Zovko
Spain F19 Futures	May 31	Lanzarote	Spain	Hard	(Portugal) João Sousa	(Spain) Georgi Rumenov Payakov / (Portugal) João Sousa
Tunisia F1 Futures	May 31	Tunis	Tunisia	Clay	(Spain) Sergio Gutiérrez Ferrol	(France) Laurent Rochette / (Russia) Mikhail Vasiliev
Argentina F8 Futures	June 7	Córdoba	Argentina	Clay	(Argentina) Marco Trungelliti	(Argentina) Lionel Noviski / (Argentina) Antonio Pastorino
China F6 Futures	June 7	Jiaxing	China	Hard	(China) Wu Di	(China) Li Zhe / (China) Gong Mao-xin
Indonesia F2 Futures	June 7	Tarakan	Indonesia	Hard (i)	(Indonesia) Christopher Rungkat	(Thailand) Weerapat Doakmaiklee / (Thailand) Kittipong Wachiramanowong
Italy F12 Futures	June 7	Mestre	Italy	Clay	(Italy) Matteo Viola	(Italy) Walter Trusendi / (Italy) Matteo Viola
Japan F5 Futures	June 7	Karuizawa	Japan	Clay	(Australia) Mark Verryth	(South Korea) Kwon Oh-hee / (South Korea) Lee Chul-hee
Netherlands F1 Futures	June 7	Apeldoorn	Netherlands	Clay	(Netherlands) Matwé Middelkoop	(Romania) Cătălin Gârd / (Brazil) André Ghem
Poland F4 Futures	June 7	Gliwice	Poland	Clay	(Czech Republic) Dušan Lojda	(Poland) Błażej Koniusz / (Poland) Grzegorz Panfil
Romania F4 Futures	June 7	Brașov	Romania	Clay	(Romania) Victor Anagnastopol	(Romania) Marcel-Ioan Miron / (Romania) Paul-Mihai Puşcaşu
Slovenia F3 Futures	June 7	Maribor	Slovenia	Clay	(Slovenia) Blaž Rola	(Slovenia) Martin Rmus / (Slovenia) Blaž Rola
Spain F20 Futures	June 7	Puerto de la Cruz	Spain	Carpet	(France) Ludovic Walter	(Spain) Georgi Rumenov Payakov / (Portugal) João Sousa
Tunisia F2 Futures	June 7	Sfax	Tunisia	Hard	(Tunisia) Malek Jaziri	(Italy) Claudio Grassi / (Russia) Mikhail Vasiliev
USA F13 Futures	June 7	Loomis	United States	Hard	(New Zealand) Michael Venus	(New Zealand) Marcus Daniell / (New Zealand) Michael Venus
Venezuela F1 Futures	June 7	Maracaibo	Venezuela	Hard	(Colombia) Robert Farah	(Colombia) Juan Sebastián Cabal / (Colombia) Robert Farah
Argentina F9 Futures	June 14	Posadas	Argentina	Clay	(Chile) Guillermo Rivera Aránguiz	(Argentina) Andrés Molteni / (Argentina) Diego Schwartzman
France F8 Futures	June 14	Blois	France	Clay	(France) Jonathan Eysseric	(France) Jonathan Eysseric / (France) Jérôme Inzerillo
Germany F5 Futures	June 14	Cologne	Germany	Clay	(Germany) Jan-Lennard Struff	(Greece) Paris Gemouchidis / (Chile) Hans Podlipnik Castillo
Indonesia F3 Futures	June 14	Tegal	Indonesia	Hard	(South Korea) Kim Young-jun	(Indonesia) Christopher Rungkat / (United States) Nathan Thompson
Italy F13 Futures	June 14	Padova	Italy	Clay	(Serbia) Nikola Ćirić	(Italy) Alessandro Giannessi / (Italy) Federico Torresi
Japan F6 Futures	June 14	Kusatsu	Japan	Carpet	(Japan) Tasuku Iwami	(Chinese Taipei) Chen I-ta / (Chinese Taipei) Hsieh Cheng-peng
Morocco F3 Futures	June 14	Rabat	Morocco	Clay	(France) Augustin Gensse	(France) Marc Auradou / (France) Gleb Sakharov
Netherlands F2 Futures	June 14	Alkmaar	Netherlands	Clay	(Finland) Timo Nieminen	(Netherlands) Matwé Middelkoop / (Netherlands) Martijn van Haasteren
Serbia F1 Futures	June 14	Belgrade	Serbia	Clay	(Ukraine) Oleksandr Nedovyesov	(Ukraine) Vadim Alekseenko / (Ukraine) Oleksandr Nedovyesov
Spain F21 Futures	June 14	La Palma	Spain	Hard	(Spain) Agustín Boje-Ordóñez	(Spain) Abraham González-Jiménez / (Spain) Miguel Ángel López Jaén
Tunisia F3 Futures	June 14	Kelibia	Tunisia	Hard	(France) Laurent Rochette	(France) Laurent Rochette / (Russia) Mikhail Vasiliev
USA F14 Futures	June 14	Davis, California	United States	Hard	(South Africa) Fritz Wolmarans	(United States) Brett Joelson / (United States) Nicholas Monroe
Venezuela F2 Futures	June 14	Coro	Venezuela	Hard	(Colombia) Juan Sebastián Cabal	(Colombia) Juan Sebastián Cabal / (Colombia) Robert Farah
Argentina F10 Futures	June 21	Posadas	Argentina	Clay	(Argentina) Andrés Molteni	(Argentina) Guillermo Durán / (Argentina) Agustín Picco
France F9 Futures	June 21	Toulon	France	Clay	(France) Augustin Gensse	(Canada) Philip Bester / (France) Jonathan Eysseric
Germany F6 Futures	June 21	Wolfsburg	Germany	Clay	(Australia) James Lemke	(Belarus) Siarhei Betau / (Russia) Andrey Kumantsov
Italy F14 Futures	June 21	Aosta	Italy	Clay	(Italy) Matteo Marrai	(United Kingdom) Morgan Phillips / (Austria) Bertram Steinberger
Japan F7 Futures	June 21	Tokyo	Japan	Carpet	(Japan) Hiroki Kondo	(Japan) Tasuku Iwami / (Japan) Hiroki Kondo
Malaysia F1 Futures	June 21	Kuala Lumpur	Malaysia	Hard	(Chinese Taipei) Yang Tsung-hua	(Chinese Taipei) Yang Tsung-hua / (Chinese Taipei) Yi Chu-huan
Morocco F4 Futures	June 21	Kenitra	Morocco	Clay	(France) Florian Reynet	(Spain) Carlos Boluda-Purkiss / (Spain) Pedro Rico
Netherlands F3 Futures	June 21	Rotterdam	Netherlands	Clay	(Netherlands) Thomas Schoorel	(Denmark) Frederik Nielsen / (France) Alexandre Renard
Norway F1 Futures	June 21	Gausdal	Norway	Hard	(Netherlands) Igor Sijsling	(Finland) Harri Heliövaara / (Finland) Juho Paukku
Serbia F2 Futures	June 21	Belgrade	Serbia	Clay	(Serbia) Nikola Ćirić	(Ukraine) Vadim Alekseenko / (Ukraine) Oleksandr Nedovyesov
Spain F22 Futures	June 21	Melilla	Spain	Hard	(Spain) Miguel Ángel López Jaén	(Spain) Abraham González-Jiménez / (Spain) Carlos Gómez-Herrera
USA F15 Futures	June 21	Chico, California	United States	Hard	(South Korea) Daniel Yoo	(Australia) Nima Roshan / (New Zealand) José Statham
Venezuela F3 Futures	June 21	Barquisimeto	Venezuela	Hard	(Colombia) Robert Farah	(Mexico) Daniel Garza / (Mexico) Antonio Ruíz-Rosales
Argentina F11 Futures	June 28	Oberá	Argentina	Clay	(Argentina) Pablo Galdón	(Argentina) Andrés Molteni / (Argentina) Diego Schwartzman
Brazil F13 Futures	June 28	Araçatuba	Brazil	Clay	(Brazil) Eládio Ribeiro Neto	(Brazil) Rogério Dutra da Silva / (Brazil) Caio Zampieri
France F10 Futures	June 28	Montauban	France	Clay	(France) Laurent Rochette	(Canada) Philip Bester / (France) Jonathan Eysseric
Germany F7 Futures	June 28	Kassel	Germany	Clay	(Uzbekistan) Farrukh Dustov	(Slovakia) Ivo Klec / (Germany) Alex Satschko
Great Britain F8 Futures	June 28	Manchester	United Kingdom	Grass	(United Kingdom) James Ward	(India) Divij Sharan / (India) Vishnu Vardhan
Italy F15 Futures	June 28	Bologna	Italy	Clay	(Italy) Andrea Stoppini	(Italy) Massimo Capone / (Italy) Marco Viola
Japan F8 Futures	June 28	Sapporo	Japan	Clay	(Japan) Hiroki Moriya	(Chinese Taipei) Lee Hsin-han / (Japan) Bumpei Sato
Malaysia F2 Futures	June 28	Kuala Lumpur	Malaysia	Hard	(India) Rohan Gajjar	(Australia) Kaden Hensel / (Australia) Dane Propoggia
Morocco F5 Futures	June 28	Khemisset	Morocco	Clay	(France) Augustin Gensse	(Morocco) Mehdi Benhammou / (Morocco) Anas Fattar
Netherlands F4 Futures	June 28	Breda	Netherlands	Clay	(Netherlands) Thomas Schoorel	(Netherlands) Matwé Middelkoop / (Netherlands) Thomas Schoorel
Norway F2 Futures	June 28	Gausdal	Norway	Hard	(Switzerland) Alexander Sadecky	(Finland) Harri Heliövaara / (Finland) Juho Paukku
Romania F5 Futures	June 28	Mediaș	Romania	Clay	(Romania) Victor Anagnastopol	(Romania) Adrian Cruciat / (Romania) Victor Ioniță
Serbia F3 Futures	June 28	Belgrade	Serbia	Clay	(Bosnia and Herzegovina) Aldin Šetkić	(Hungary) György Balázs / (Serbia) David Savić
Spain F23 Futures	June 28	Palma del Río	Spain	Hard	(Belgium) Ruben Bemelmans	(Russia) Evgeny Kirillov / (Russia) Alexander Kudryavtsev
USA F16 Futures	June 28	Rochester, New York	United States	Clay	(South Korea) Daniel Yoo	(United States) Cory Parr / (United States) Conor Pollock
Argentina F12 Futures	July 5	Resistencia	Argentina	Clay	(Argentina) Pablo Galdón	(Argentina) Rodrigo Albano / (Argentina) Marco Trungelliti
Austria F1 Futures	July 5	Telfs	Austria	Clay	(Serbia) Nikola Ćirić	(Russia) Andrey Kumantsov / (Serbia) David Savić
Brazil F12 Futures	July 5	Sorocaba	Brazil	Clay	(Brazil) Caio Zampieri	(Brazil) Alexandre Bonatto / (Brazil) Rodrigo Guidolin
France F11 Futures	July 5	Bourg-en-Bresse	France	Clay	(France) Romain Jouan	(France) Jérôme Inzerillo / (France) Romain Jouan
Germany F8 Futures	July 5	Römerberg	Germany	Clay	(Belgium) David Goffin	(Germany) Marco Kirschner / (Germany) Marko Lenz
Great Britain F9 Futures	July 5	Ilkley	United Kingdom	Grass	(United Kingdom) Joshua Goodall	(United Kingdom) Andrew Fitzpatrick / (United Kingdom) Joshua Goodall
Italy F16 Futures	July 5	Desenzano	Italy	Clay	(Russia) Mikhail Vasiliev	(Italy) Nicola Remedi / (Italy) Andrea Stoppini
Romania F6 Futures	July 5	Cluj	Romania	Clay	(Spain) Javier Martí	(Italy) Federico Torresi / (Italy) Giulio Torroni
Spain F24 Futures	July 5	Bakio	Spain	Hard	(France) Fabrice Martin	(France) Alexis Heugas / (France) Alexis Musialek
USA F17 Futures	July 5	Pittsburgh	United States	Clay	(United States) Adam El Mihdawy	(United States) Tennys Sandgren / (United States) Rhyne Williams
Argentina F13 Futures	July 12	Corrientes	Argentina	Clay	(Argentina) Pablo Galdón	(Argentina) Pablo Galdón / (Argentina) Joaquín-Jésus Monteferrario
Austria F2 Futures	July 12	Kramsach	Austria	Clay	(Austria) Johannes Ager	(Czech Republic) Petr Kovačka / (Czech Republic) Marek Michalička
Brazil F15 Futures	July 12	Guarulhos	Brazil	Clay	(Brazil) Marcelo Demoliner	(Brazil) Marcelo Demoliner / (Brazil) Rodrigo Guidolin
Estonia F1 Futures	July 12	Kuressaare	Estonia	Clay	(Spain) Pablo Santos	(Latvia) Andis Juška / (Latvia) Deniss Pavlovs
France F12 Futures	July 12	Saint Gervais	France	Clay	(Canada) Philip Bester	(France) Jérôme Inzerillo / (France) Romain Jouan
Germany F9 Futures	July 12	Trier	Germany	Clay	(Bulgaria) Grigor Dimitrov	(Belgium) Alexandre Folie / (Belgium) David Goffin
Great Britain F10 Futures	July 12	Frinton-on-Sea	United Kingdom	Grass	(United Kingdom) Daniel Cox	(United Kingdom) Timothy Bradshaw / (United States) James Ludlow
Iran F1 Futures	July 12	Tehran	Iran	Clay	(Hungary) Attila Bálazs	(Belarus) Pavel Katliarov / (Russia) Stanislav Vovk
Italy F17 Futures	July 12	Fano	Italy	Clay	(Croatia) Nikola Mektić	(Italy) Claudio Grassi / (Italy) Stefano Ianni
Romania F7 Futures	July 12	Iași	Romania	Clay	(France) Maxime Teixeira	(Croatia) Marin Draganja / (Croatia) Dino Marcan
Spain F25 Futures	July 12	Elche	Spain	Clay	(Spain) Marcelo Palacios-Siegenthale	(Spain) Carlos Calderón-Rodríguez / (Spain) Marc Fornell Mestres
USA F18 Futures	July 12	Peoria, Illinois	United States	Clay	(United States) Greg Ouellette	(United States) Taylor Fogleman / (United States) Benjamin Rogers
Argentina F14 Futures	July 19	Rafaela	Argentina	Clay	(Argentina) Andrés Molteni	(Argentina) Andrés Molteni / (Argentina) Diego Schwartzman
Brazil F16 Futures	July 19	Jundiaí	Brazil	Clay	(Brazil) Rogério Dutra da Silva	(Brazil) Rogério Dutra da Silva / (Brazil) Júlio Silva
Estonia F2 Futures	July 19	Tallinn	Estonia	Clay	(Estonia) Jürgen Zopp	(Finland) Harri Heliövaara / (Finland) Juho Paukku
Iran F2 Futures	July 19	Tehran	Iran	Clay	(Hungary) Attila Balázs	(Hungary) Attila Balázs / (Hungary) György Balázs
Ireland F1 Futures	July 19	Dublin	Ireland	Carpet	(United Kingdom) Daniel Cox	(Republic of Ireland) James Cluskey / (Republic of Ireland) Colin O'Brien
Italy F18 Futures	July 19	Modena	Italy	Clay	(Italy) Matteo Viola	(Italy) Francesco Aldi / (Italy) Walter Trusendi
Romania F8 Futures	July 19	Craiova	Romania	Clay	(Croatia) Kristijan Mesaroš	(Romania) Andrei Mlendea / (Russia) Mikhail Vasiliev
Spain F26 Futures	July 19	Gandia	Spain	Clay	(Spain) Marc Fornell Mestres	(Spain) César Ferrer-Victoria / (Spain) Pablo Martín-Adalia
USA F19 Futures	July 19	Joplin, Missouri	United States	Hard	(United States) Robbye Poole	(South Africa) Jean Andersen / (United States) Joshua Zavala
Brazil F17 Futures	July 26	Uberlândia	Brazil	Clay	(Brazil) Rafael Camilo	(Brazil) Víctor Maynard / (Brazil) Nicolás Santos
Germany F10 Futures	July 26	Dortmund	Germany	Clay	(Bulgaria) Grigor Dimitrov	(Netherlands Antilles) Alexander Blom / (Netherlands) Wesley Koolhof
Great Britain F11 Futures	July 26	Chiswick	United Kingdom	Hard	(Slovakia) Miloslav Mečíř Jr.	(India) Divij Sharan / (India) Vishnu Vardhan
Italy F19 Futures	July 26	La Spezia	Italy	Clay	(Italy) Thomas Fabbiano	(Italy) Flavio Cipolla / (Italy) Alessandro Giannessi
Romania F9 Futures	July 26	Arad	Romania	Clay	(France) Maxime Teixeira	(Romania) Alexandru Carpen / (Italy) Alexandru Cătălin Marasin
Spain F27 Futures	July 26	Dénia	Spain	Clay	(Spain) Miguel Ángel López Jaén	(Spain) Carlos Calderón-Rodríguez / (Spain) Marc Fornell Mestres
USA F20 Futures	July 26	Godfrey, Illinois	United States	Hard	(United States) Robbye Poole	(United States) Jordan Cox / (United States) Evan King
Argentina F15 Futures	August 2	Buenos Aires	Argentina	Clay	(Argentina) Facundo Argüello	(Argentina) Guillermo Bujniewicz / (Argentina) Guillermo Durán
Germany F11 Futures	August 2	Wetzlar	Germany	Clay	(Germany) Alexander Flock	(Argentina) Diego Álvarez / (Argentina) Juan-Martín Aranguren
Great Britain F12 Futures	August 2	Roehampton	United Kingdom	Hard	(United Kingdom) Joshua Milton	(United States) Ashwin Kumar / (France) Laurent Rochette
Italy F20 Futures	August 2	Avezzano	Italy	Clay	(Italy) Francesco Piccari	(Italy) Andrea Falgheri / (Italy) Claudio Grassi
Lithuania F1 Futures	August 2	Vilnius	Lithuania	Clay	(Finland) Timo Nieminen	(Latvia) Deniss Pavlovs / (Russia) Mikhail Vasiliev
Romania F10 Futures	August 2	Bucharest	Romania	Clay	(Romania) Andrei Mlendea	(Ukraine) Gleb Alekseenko / (Ukraine) Vadim Alekseenko
Russia F3 Futures	August 2	Moscow	Russia	Clay	(Russia) Ilya Belyaev	(Russia) Ilya Belyaev / (Russia) Mikhail Elgin
Serbia F4 Futures	August 2	Novi Sad	Serbia	Clay	(Serbia) Dušan Lajović	(Serbia) Boris Čonkić / (Serbia) Ivan Đurđević
Slovakia F1 Futures	August 2	Piešťany	Slovakia	Clay	(France) Florian Reynet	(Slovakia) Michal Pažický / (Slovakia) Adrian Sikora
Spain F28 Futures	August 2	Xàtiva	Spain	Clay	(Spain) Marc Fornell Mestres	(Spain) Carlos Calderón-Rodríguez / (Spain) Marc Fornell Mestres
Thailand F1 Futures	August 2	Nonthaburi	Thailand	Hard	(Egypt) Mohamed Safwat	(Kuwait) Abdullah Magdas / (Germany) Sebastian Rieschick
USA F21 Futures	August 2	Decatur, Illinois	United States	Hard	(United States) Ryler DeHeart	(United States) Jarmere Jenkins / (United States) Todd Paul
Argentina F16 Futures	August 9	Santiago del Estero	Argentina	Clay	(Argentina) Pablo Galdón	(Argentina) Guillermo Bujniewicz / (Argentina) Guillermo Durán
Austria F3 Futures	August 9	Bad Waltersdorf	Austria	Clay	(Slovenia) Blaž Rola	(Austria) Nicolas Reissig / (Austria) Tristan Samuel Weissborn
Belarus F1 Futures	August 9	Minsk	Belarus	Clay	(Spain) Guillermo Olaso	(Spain) Guillermo Olaso / (Czech Republic) Michal Schmid
Belgium F1 Futures	August 9	Eupen	Belgium	Clay	(Belgium) David Goffin	(Germany) Dominik Pfeiffer / (Germany) Peter Torebko
Finland F1 Futures	August 9	Vierumäki	Finland	Clay	(Finland) Juho Paukku	(Finland) Harri Heliövaara / (Finland) Juho Paukku
Germany F12 Futures	August 9	Friedberg	Germany	Clay	(France) Augustin Gensse	(France) Pierre-Hugues Herbert / (United States) Nicolas Meister
Italy F21 Futures	August 9	Appiano	Italy	Clay	(Italy) Marco Crugnola	(Egypt) Karim Maamoun / (Egypt) Sherif Sabry
Russia F4 Futures	August 9	Moscow	Russia	Clay	(Russia) Mikhail Vasiliev	(Russia) Ilya Belyaev / (Serbia) David Savić
Serbia F5 Futures	August 9	Novi Sad	Serbia	Clay	(Bosnia and Herzegovina) Aldin Šetkić	(Serbia) Dušan Lajović / (Serbia) Ilija Vučić
Slovakia F2 Futures	August 9	Piešťany	Slovakia	Clay	(Poland) Marcin Gawron	(France) Jérôme Inzerillo / (France) Florian Reynet
Spain F29 Futures	August 9	Irún	Spain	Clay	(Bulgaria) Grigor Dimitrov	(Spain) Agustín Boje-Ordóñez / (Spain) Andoni Vivanco-Guzmán
Thailand F2 Futures	August 9	Phitsanulok	Thailand	Hard	(Germany) Sebastian Rieschick	(Japan) Hiroki Kondo / (India) Ashutosh Singh
Argentina F17 Futures	August 16	Salta	Argentina	Clay	(Argentina) Joaquín-Jésus Monteferrario	(Argentina) Guillermo Bujniewicz / (Chile) Cristóbal Saavedra Corvalán
Austria F4 Futures	August 16	Sankt Pölten	Austria	Clay	(Czech Republic) Daniel Lustig	(Australia) Colin Ebelthite / (Australia) James Lemke
Belgium F2 Futures	August 16	Koksijde	Belgium	Clay	(France) Jonathan Eysseric	(Netherlands) Bart Brons / (Netherlands) Tim van Terheijden
Brazil F19 Futures	August 16	São José dos Campos	Brazil	Clay	(Brazil) André Miele	(Brazil) Thiago Augusto Bitencourt Pinheiro / (Brazil) Idio Escobar
Bulgaria F4 Futures	August 16	Sofia	Bulgaria	Clay	(Argentina) Diego Álvarez	(Germany) Pirmin Hänle / (Spain) Óscar Sabaté-Bretos
Colombia F1 Futures	August 16	Bogotá	Colombia	Clay	(Argentina) Sebastián Decoud	(Peru) Mauricio Echazú / (United States) Maciek Sykut
Croatia F4 Futures	August 16	Čakovec	Croatia	Clay	(Croatia) Kristijan Mesaroš	(Croatia) Marin Draganja / (Croatia) Dino Marcan
Italy F22 Futures	August 16	Padova	Italy	Clay	(Italy) Matteo Viola	(Italy) Marco Crugnola / (Italy) Alessandro Motti
Latvia F1 Futures	August 16	Jūrmala	Latvia	Clay	(France) Augustin Gensse	(Republic of Ireland) James Cluskey / (Republic of Ireland) Colin O'Brien
Poland F5 Futures	August 16	Olsztyn	Poland	Clay	(Germany) Alexander Flock	(Poland) Mateusz Kowalczyk / (Poland) Grzegorz Panfil
Russia F5 Futures	August 16	Moscow	Russia	Clay	(Russia) Aleksandr Lobkov	(Russia) Richard Muzaev / (Russia) Sergey Strelkov
Serbia F6 Futures	August 16	Sombor	Serbia	Clay	(Serbia) Ivan Bjelica	(Serbia) Ivan Bjelica / (Serbia) Miljan Zekić
Slovakia F3 Futures	August 16	Michalovce	Slovakia	Clay	(Slovakia) Michal Pažický	(Slovakia) Michal Pažický / (Slovakia) Adrian Sikora
Spain F30 Futures	August 16	Vigo	Spain	Clay	(Spain) Pablo Santos	(Spain) Abraham González-Jiménez / (Spain) Roberto Ortega Olmedo
Thailand F3 Futures	August 16	Nakhon Ratchasima	Thailand	Hard	(Germany) Sebastian Rieschick	(Germany) Sebastian Rieschick / (Thailand) Danai Udomchoke
Austria F5 Futures	August 23	Pörtschach	Austria	Clay	(France) Axel Michon	(Czech Republic) Jan Blecha / (Austria) Gibril Diarra
Belgium F3 Futures	August 23	Huy	Belgium	Clay	(France) Julien Obry	(Belgium) Marco Dierckx / (Belgium) Mario Dierckx
Brazil F21 Futures	August 23	Campo Grande	Brazil	Clay	(Brazil) Rogério Dutra da Silva	(Brazil) Rafael Camilo / (Uruguay) Marcel Felder
Bulgaria F5 Futures	August 23	Bourgas	Bulgaria	Clay	(Hungary) Ádám Kellner	(Argentina) Diego Álvarez / (Italy) Federico Torresi
Colombia F2 Futures	August 23	Medellín	Colombia	Clay	(Argentina) Sebastián Decoud	(Ecuador) Iván Endara / (Chile) Guillermo Rivera Aránguiz
Croatia F5 Futures	August 23	Vinkovci	Croatia	Clay	(Croatia) Kristijan Mesaroš	(Croatia) Mislav Hižak / (Croatia) Ante Pavić
Germany F13 Futures	August 23	Überlingen	Germany	Clay	(Germany) Dennis Blömke	(Germany) Florian Fallert / (Germany) Jakob Sude
Italy F23 Futures	August 23	Piombino	Italy	Hard	(Italy) Claudio Grassi	(Montenegro) Daniel Danilović / (Italy) Claudio Grassi
Mexico F5 Futures	August 23	Zacatecas	Mexico	Hard	(United Kingdom) David Rice	(Mexico) Juan Manuel Elizondo / (Mexico) César Ramírez
Netherlands F5 Futures	August 23	Enschede	Netherlands	Clay	(Germany) Alexander Flock	(Australia) Clint Thomson / (Netherlands) Boy Westerhof
Poland F6 Futures	August 23	Poznań	Poland	Clay	(Poland) Marcin Gawron	(Poland) Bartosz Sawicki / (Poland) Maciej Smoła
Russia F6 Futures	August 23	Sochi	Russia	Clay	(Russia) Alexander Rumyantsev	(Russia) Ervand Gasparyan / (Russia) Vadim Kutsenko
Austria F6 Futures	August 30	Wels	Austria	Clay	(France) Axel Michon	(Germany) Jeremy Jahn / (Austria) Herbert Wiltschnig
Brazil F22 Futures	August 30	São José do Rio Preto	Brazil	Clay	(Brazil) André Miele	(Brazil) Rafael Camilo / (Brazil) Fabrício Neis
Bulgaria F6 Futures	August 30	Dobrich	Austria	Clay	(Austria) Philipp Oswald	(Hungary) Levente Gödry / (Hungary) Ádám Kellner
Colombia F3 Futures	August 30	Manizales	Colombia	Clay	(Dominican Republic) Víctor Estrella	(United States) Maciek Sykut / (United States) Denis Zivkovic
Croatia F6 Futures	August 30	Osijek	Croatia	Clay	(Croatia) Kristijan Mesaroš	(Croatia) Mislav Hižak / (Croatia) Ante Pavić
Germany F14 Futures	August 30	Kempten	Germany	Clay	(Germany) Marcel Zimmermann	(Germany) Marc Meigel / (Germany) Richard Waite
Italy F24 Futures	August 30	Trieste	Italy	Clay	(Italy) Luca Vanni	(Mexico) Luis Díaz Barriga / (Mexico) Miguel Ángel Reyes-Varela
Mexico F6 Futures	August 30	León	Mexico	Hard	(Canada) Vasek Pospisil	(Mexico) Juan Manuel Elizondo / (Mexico) César Ramírez
Netherlands F6 Futures	August 30	Middelburg	Netherlands	Clay	(Netherlands) Matwé Middelkoop	(Finland) Timo Nieminen / (Finland) Juho Paukku
Poland F7 Futures	August 30	Bydgoszcz	Poland	Clay	(Belarus) Siarhei Betau	(Poland) Rafał Gozdur / (Poland) Mateusz Szmigiel
Russia F7 Futures	August 30	Moscow	Russia	Clay	(Russia) Mikhail Elgin	(Russia) Mikhail Elgin / (Latvia) Deniss Pavlovs
Spain F31 Futures	August 30	Santander	Spain	Clay	(United Kingdom) James Ward	(Spain) Miguel Ángel López Jaén / (Spain) Pablo Santos
Australia F5 Futures	September 6	Cairns	Australia	Hard	(Australia) Dayne Kelly	(Australia) Colin Ebelthite / (Australia) Adam Feeney
Brazil F23 Futures	September 6	Fortaleza	Brazil	Clay	(Brazil) Júlio Silva	(Uruguay) Marcel Felder / (Brazil) Fernando Romboli
Burundi F1 Futures	September 6	Bujumbura	Burundi	Clay	(Austria) Gerald Melzer	(Belgium) Marco Dierckx / (Belgium) Bart Govaerts
Ecuador F1 Futures	September 6	Guayaquil	Ecuador	Hard	(Ecuador) Julio César Campozano	(Colombia) Nicolás Barrientos / (Colombia) Sebastián Serrano
France F13 Futures	September 6	Bagnères-de-Bigorre	France	Hard	(France) Grégoire Burquier	(Italy) Riccardo Ghedin / (France) Alexandre Penaud
Germany F15 Futures	September 6	Kenn	Germany	Clay	(France) Antony Dupuis	(Germany) Steven Moneke / (Chile) Laslo Urrutia
Great Britain F13 Futures	September 6	Cumberland	United Kingdom	Clay	(United Kingdom) Daniel Cox	(United Kingdom) David Rice / (United Kingdom) Sean Thornley
Italy F25 Futures	September 6	Siena	Italy	Clay	(Italy) Luca Vanni	(Italy) Massimo Capone / (Italy) Matteo Viola
Mexico F7 Futures	September 6	Guadalajara	Mexico	Hard	(Canada) Vasek Pospisil	(Barbados) Haydn Lewis / (The Bahamas) Marvin Rolle
Russia F8 Futures	September 6	Vsevolozhsk	Russia	Clay	(Russia) Mikhail Elgin	(Russia) Ervand Gasparyan / (Russia) Vadim Kutsenko
Spain F32 Futures	September 6	Oviedo	Spain	Hard	(Spain) Roberto Carballés	(Spain) Pablo Carreño Busta / (Spain) Andoni Vivanco-Guzmán
Australia F6 Futures	September 13	Darwin	Australia	Hard	(Australia) John Millman	(Australia) Colin Ebelthite / (Australia) Adam Feeney
Bolivia F1 Futures	September 13	Tarija	Bolivia	Clay	(United States) Adam El Mihdawy	(Peru) Mauricio Echazú / (Peru) Sergio Galdós
Brazil F24 Futures	September 13	Recife	Brazil	Clay (i)	(Brazil) Daniel Dutra da Silva	(Argentina) Juan-Pablo Amado / (Brazil) Ricardo Siggia
Ecuador F2 Futures	September 13	Guayaquil	Ecuador	Hard	(Ecuador) Julio César Campozano	(Peru) Duilio Beretta / (Ecuador) Roberto Quiroz
France F14 Futures	September 13	Mulhouse	France	Hard (i)	(France) Clément Reix	(France) Olivier Charroin / (Japan) Junn Mitsuhashi
Great Britain F14 Futures	September 13	Nottingham	United Kingdom	Hard	(United Kingdom) Joshua Milton	(United Kingdom) Lewis Burton / (United Kingdom) Daniel Evans
Italy F26 Futures	September 13	Porto Torres	Italy	Clay	(Italy) Claudio Grassi	(Italy) Claudio Grassi / (Italy) Francesco Piccari
Morocco F6 Futures	September 13	Casablanca	Morocco	Clay	(France) Maxime Teixeira	(France) Florian Reynet / (France) Maxime Teixeira
Rwanda F1 Futures	September 13	Kigali	Rwanda	Clay	(Austria) Gerald Melzer	(Russia) Alexei Filenkov / (Russia) Stanislav Vovk
Spain F33 Futures	September 13	Móstoles	Spain	Hard	(Spain) Roberto Bautista Agut	(Canada) Philip Bester / (Canada) Kamil Pajkowski
Sweden F1 Futures	September 13	Danderyd	Sweden	Hard (i)	(Finland) Henri Kontinen	(Montenegro) Daniel Danilović / (Sweden) Michael Ryderstedt
USA F23 Futures	September 13	Claremont	United States	Hard	(South Africa) Gary Sacks	(United States) Taylor Fogleman / (United States) Chris Kearney
Australia F7 Futures	September 20	Alice Springs	Australia	Hard	(Australia) Colin Ebelthite	(Australia) Colin Ebelthite / (Australia) Adam Feeney
Bolivia F2 Futures	September 20	La Paz	Bolivia	Clay	(Argentina) Guillermo Carry	(Peru) Francisco Carbajal / (Guatemala) Christopher Díaz Figueroa
Canada F4 Futures	September 20	Toronto	Canada	Hard	(United States) Nicholas Monroe	(United States) Brett Joelson / (United States) Ashwin Kumar
China F7 Futures	September 20	Hangzhou	China	Hard	(China) Bai Yan	(China) Gao Peng / (China) Gao Wan
France F15 Futures	September 20	Plaisir	France	Hard (i)	(France) Clément Reix	(France) Nicolas Grammare / (India) Ashutosh Singh
Great Britain F15 Futures	September 20	Wrexham	United Kingdom	Hard	(United Kingdom) Daniel Cox	(United Kingdom) Lewis Burton / (United Kingdom) Daniel Evans
Iran F3 Futures	September 20	Tehran	Iran	Clay	(Russia) Alexander Rumyantsev	(Ukraine) Ivan Anikanov / (Uzbekistan) Murad Inoyatov
Italy F27 Futures	September 20	Brusaporto	Italy	Hard (i)	(Sweden) Filip Prpic	(Italy) Erik Crepaldi / (Italy) Claudio Grassi
Morocco F7 Futures	September 20	Tanger	Morocco	Clay	(Spain) Sergio Gutiérrez Ferrol	(Spain) Gerard Granollers Pujol / (Spain) Carles Poch Gradin
Spain F34 Futures	September 20	Madrid	Spain	Hard	(United Kingdom) Morgan Phillips	(Spain) Óscar Burrieza / (Spain) Javier Martí
Sweden F2 Futures	September 20	Falun	Sweden	Hard (i)	(Finland) Henri Kontinen	(Sweden) Carl Bergman / (Sweden) Markus Eriksson
USA F24 Futures	September 20	Costa Mesa, California	United States	Hard	(South Africa) Fritz Wolmarans	(Mexico) Daniel Garza / (France) Fabrice Martin
Uganda F1 Futures	September 20	Kampala	Uganda	Clay	(Austria) Gerald Melzer	(United Kingdom) James Feaver / (South Africa) Ruan Roelofse
Bolivia F3 Futures	September 27	Cochabamba	Bolivia	Clay	(Argentina) Diego Schwartzman	(Bolivia) Mauricio Doria-Medina / (Bolivia) Mauricio Estívariz
Brazil F26 Futures	September 27	Itu	Brazil	Clay	(Brazil) Fernando Romboli	(Brazil) Rodrigo Grilli / (Brazil) Fernando Romboli
Canada F5 Futures	September 27	Markham	Canada	Hard (i)	(Canada) Vasek Pospisil	(United States) Chris Kwon / (United States) Conor Pollock
China F8 Futures	September 27	Shanghai	China	Hard	(China) Bai Yan	(China) Li Zhe / (China) Gong Mao-xin
France F16 Futures	September 27	Sarreguemines	France	Carpet (i)	(France) Albano Olivetti	(France) Julien Obry / (France) Albano Olivetti
Germany F16 Futures	September 27	Hambach	France	Carpet (i)	(Russia) Denis Matsukevich	(Latvia) Kārlis Lejnieks / (Russia) Denis Matsukevich
Iran F4 Futures	September 27	Tehran	Iran	Clay	(Russia) Aleksandr Lobkov	(Russia) Alexander Rumyantsev / (Russia) Aleksandr Lobkov
Italy F28 Futures	September 27	Frascati	Italy	Clay	(France) Augustin Gensse	(Spain) Óscar Burrieza / (Spain) Javier Martí
Kazakhstan F3 Futures	September 27	Astana	Kazakhstan	Hard (i)	(Russia) Richard Muzaev	(Russia) Vitali Reshetnikov / (Belarus) Andrei Vasilevski
Portugal F4 Futures	September 27	Porto	Portugal	Clay	(France) Laurent Rochette	(Spain) Sergio Gutiérrez Ferrol / (Spain) Carles Poch Gradin
Spain F35 Futures	September 27	Martos	Spain	Hard	(Spain) Adrián Menéndez Maceiras	(India) Divij Sharan / (India) Vishnu Vardhan
Turkey F9 Futures	September 27	Antalya	Turkey	Hard	(Australia) Samuel Groth	(Montenegro) Daniel Danilović / (Finland) Juho Paukku
USA F25 Futures	September 27	Irvine, California	United States	Hard	(Australia) Chris Guccione	(United States) Nathaniel Gorham / (United States) Dennis Novikov
Australia F8 Futures	October 4	Port Pirie	Australia	Hard	(Australia) Colin Ebelthite	(Australia) Jared Easton / (Australia) Joel Lindner
Bolivia F4 Futures	October 4	Santa Cruz	Bolivia	Clay	(Argentina) Renzo Olivo	(Bolivia) Hugo Dellien / (Bolivia) Federico Zeballos
Brazil F27 Futures	October 4	Salvador	Brazil	Hard	(Brazil) Daniel Dutra da Silva	(Greece) Theodoros Angelinos / (Brazil) Diego Matos
France F17 Futures	October 4	Nevers	France	Hard (i)	(France) Grégoire Burquier	(France) Simon Cauvard / (France) Grégoire Burquier
Germany F17 Futures	October 4	Leimen	Germany	Hard (i)	(Finland) Timo Nieminen	(Finland) Timo Nieminen / (Czech Republic) Michal Schmid
Iran F5 Futures	October 4	Tehran	Iran	Clay	(Russia) Aleksandr Lobkov	(Indonesia) Elbert Sie / (India) Ranjeet Virali-Murugesan
Italy F29 Futures	October 4	Naples	Italy	Hard	(Italy) Claudio Grassi	(Italy) Erik Crepaldi / (Italy) Claudio Grassi
Kazakhstan F4 Futures	October 4	Astana	Kazakhstan	Hard (i)	(Russia) Mikhail Elgin	(Russia) Mikhail Elgin / (Belarus) Andrei Vasilevski
Portugal F5 Futures	October 4	Espinho	Portugal	Clay	(Spain) Javier Martí	(Spain) Carlos Boluda-Purkiss / (Spain) Pedro Rico
Spain F36 Futures	October 4	Córdoba	Spain	Hard	(Tunisia) Malek Jaziri	(Portugal) João Sousa / (Spain) Israel Vior-Díaz
Turkey F10 Futures	October 4	Antalya	Turkey	Hard	(Australia) Samuel Groth	(Ukraine) Artem Smirnov / (Hungary) Róbert Varga
Australia F9 Futures	October 11	Happy Valley	Australia	Hard	(Australia) Nick Lindahl	(Australia) Colin Ebelthite / (Australia) Adam Feeney
Belarus F3 Futures	October 11	Minsk	Belarus	Hard (i)	(Poland) Jerzy Janowicz	(Belarus) Siarhei Betau / (Belarus) Dzmitry Zhyrmont
Brazil F28 Futures	October 11	Fernandópolis	Brazil	Clay	(Sweden) Christian Lindell	(Sweden) Christian Lindell / (Brazil) Fabrício Neis
France F18 Futures	October 11	Saint-Dizier	France	Hard (i)	(Belgium) David Goffin	(France) Julien Maes / (France) Fabrice Martin
Germany F18 Futures	October 11	Isernhagen	Germany	Hard (i)	(Latvia) Kārlis Lejnieks	(Germany) Nicolas Kiefer / (Germany) Stefan Seifert
Greece F1 Futures	October 11	Kos	Greece	Hard	(Finland) Juho Paukku	(Italy) Andrea Falgheri / (Italy) Claudio Grassi
Italy F30 Futures	October 11	Reggio di Calabria	Italy	Clay	(Italy) Alessio di Mauro	(Italy) Andrea Arnaboldi / (Italy) Gianluca Naso
Japan F9 Futures	October 11	Kashiwa	Japan	Hard	(Thailand) Danai Udomchoke	(Japan) Yuichi Ito / (Chinese Taipei) Yi Chu-huan
Kazakhstan F5 Futures	October 11	Almaty	Kazakhstan	Hard (i)	(Belgium) Julien Dubail	(Russia) Sergei Krotiouk / (Kazakhstan) Alexey Kedryuk
Kuwait F1 Futures	October 11	Mishref	Kuwait	Hard	(Germany) Sebastian Rieschick	(Croatia) Roko Karanušić / (Germany) Sebastian Rieschick
Turkey F11 Futures	October 11	Antalya	Turkey	Hard	(Moldova) Radu Albot	(Slovakia) Kamil Čapkovič / (Ukraine) Denys Molchanov
USA F26 Futures	October 11	Austin, Texas	United States	Hard	(United States) Denis Kudla	(South Africa) Chris Haggard / (United States) Conor Pollock
Venezuela F4 Futures	October 11	Caracas	Venezuela	Hard	(United States) Greg Ouellette	(United States) Greg Ouellette / (United States) Maciek Sykut
Argentina F20 Futures	October 18	La Rioja	Argentina	Clay	(Argentina) Jonathan Gonzalia	(Argentina) Patricio Heras / (Argentina) Agustín Picco
Belarus F4 Futures	October 18	Minsk	Belarus	Hard (i)	(Belarus) Siarhei Betau	(Belarus) Siarhei Betau / (Belarus) Dzmitry Zhyrmont
Brazil F29 Futures	October 18	São Leopoldo	Brazil	Clay	(Brazil) Rafael Camilo	(Brazil) Fernando Romboli / (Brazil) Nicolás Santos
Chile F1 Futures	October 18	Santiago	Chile	Clay	(Chile) Guillermo Rivera Aránguiz	(Chile) Guillermo Hormazábal / (Chile) Rodrigo Pérez
Croatia F7 Futures	October 18	Dubrovnik	Croatia	Clay	(Hungary) Attila Balázs	(Italy) Andrea Arnaboldi / (United Kingdom) Morgan Phillips
Egypt F4 Futures	October 18	Cairo	Egypt	Clay	(Russia) Aleksandr Lobkov	(Serbia) Dušan Lajović / (Serbia) Miljan Zekić
France F19 Futures	October 18	La Roche-sur-Yon	France	Hard (i)	(France) Clément Reix	(France) Jérémy Blandin / (France) Alexandre Renard
Great Britain F16 Futures	October 18	Glasgow	United Kingdom	Hard (i)	(Australia) Matthew Ebden	(United Kingdom) Lewis Burton / (United Kingdom) Daniel Evans
Greece F2 Futures	October 18	Paros	Greece	Carpet	(Hungary) Ádám Kellner	(Hungary) Kornél Bardóczky / (Hungary) Ádám Kellner
Japan F10 Futures	October 18	Nishitama	Japan	Hard	(Thailand) Danai Udomchoke	(Japan) Tasuku Iwami / (Japan) Hiroki Kondo
Kuwait F2 Futures	October 18	Mishref	Kuwait	Hard	(Slovakia) Martin Kližan	(Croatia) Roko Karanušić / (Germany) Sebastian Rieschick
Nigeria F1 Futures	October 18	Lagos	Nigeria	Hard	(Israel) Amir Weintraub	(Israel) Amir Weintraub / (Netherlands) Boy Westerhof
Paraguay F1 Futures	October 18	Lambaré	Paraguay	Clay	(Argentina) Juan-Pablo Amado	(Paraguay) Diego Galeano / (Paraguay) Daniel-Alejandro López
Spain F37 Futures	October 18	Sabadell	Spain	Clay	(Spain) Sergio Gutiérrez Ferrol	(Spain) Miguel Ángel López Jaén / (Spain) Pablo Santos
Turkey F12 Futures	October 18	Adana	Turkey	Hard	(Romania) Adrian Cruciat	(Romania) Teodor-Dacian Crăciun / (Romania) Adrian Cruciat
USA F27 Futures	October 18	Mansfield, Texas	United States	Hard	(South Africa) Fritz Wolmarans	(Bulgaria) Dimitar Kutrovsky / (United States) Joshua Zavala
Venezuela F5 Futures	October 18	Caracas	Venezuela	Hard	(Colombia) Alejandro González	(United States) Peter Aarts / (South Africa) Damon Gooch
Argentina F21 Futures	October 25	San Juan	Argentina	Clay	(Argentina) Facundo Argüello	(Argentina) Guillermo Carry / (Argentina) Diego Schwartzman
Brazil F30 Futures	October 25	Porto Alegre	Brazil	Clay	(Brazil) Daniel Dutra da Silva	(Italy) Giorgio Portaluri / (Argentina) Juan-Pablo Villar
Chile F2 Futures	October 25	Santiago	Chile	Clay	(Chile) Guillermo Hormazábal	(Chile) Guillermo Rivera Aránguiz / (Chile) Cristóbal Saavedra Corvalán
Croatia F8 Futures	October 25	Dubrovnik	Croatia	Clay	(Croatia) Kristijan Mesaroš	(Bosnia and Herzegovina) Tomislav Brkić / (Bosnia and Herzegovina) Damir Džumhur
Egypt F5 Futures	October 25	Cairo	Egypt	Clay	(Serbia) Miljan Zekić	(Russia) Alexander Rumyantsev / (Russia) Aleksandr Lobkov
France F20 Futures	October 25	Rodez	France	Hard (i)	(France) Grégoire Burquier	(France) Olivier Charroin / (France) Vincent Stouff
Great Britain F17 Futures	October 25	Cardiff	United Kingdom	Hard (i)	(Estonia) Jürgen Zopp	(United Kingdom) Joshua Goodall / (United Kingdom) Dominic Inglot
Greece F3 Futures	October 25	Heraklion	Greece	Carpet	(Italy) Andrea Falgheri	(Republic of Ireland) Daniel Glancy / (United Kingdom) Marcus Willis
Nigeria F2 Futures	October 25	Lagos	Nigeria	Hard	(India) Karan Rastogi	(Israel) Amir Weintraub / (Netherlands) Boy Westerhof
Paraguay F2 Futures	October 25	Asunción	Paraguay	Clay	(Argentina) Agustín Velotti	(Paraguay) Diego Galeano / (Paraguay) Daniel-Alejandro López
Spain F38 Futures	October 25	Sant Cugat	Spain	Clay	(Spain) Guillermo Olaso	(Spain) Miguel Ángel López Jaén / (Spain) Pablo Santos
Turkey F13 Futures	October 25	Antalya	Turkey	Clay	(Germany) Gero Kretschmer	(Sweden) Patrik Brydolf / (Finland) Micke Kontinen
USA F28 Futures	October 25	Birmingham, Alabama	United States	Clay	(Canada) Philip Bester	(Canada) Philip Bester / (Canada) Kamil Pajkowski
Argentina F22 Futures	November 1	Rosario	Argentina	Clay	(Argentina) Andrés Molteni	(Argentina) Diego Cristín / (Argentina) Pablo Galdón
Australia F10 Futures	November 1	Kalgoorlie	Australia	Hard	(Canada) Érik Chvojka	(Australia) Joel Lindner / (Australia) Matt Reid
Brazil F31 Futures	November 1	Porto Alegre	Brazil	Clay	(Brazil) André Ghem	(Brazil) Nicolás Santos / (Brazil) Daniel Dutra da Silva
Chile F3 Futures	November 1	Santiago	Chile	Clay	(Chile) Cristóbal Saavedra Corvalán	(Chile) Guillermo Hormazábal / (Chile) Rodrigo Pérez
Greece F4 Futures	November 1	Heraklion	Greece	Hard	(Greece) Alexandros Jakupovic	(Republic of Ireland) Sam Barry / (Latvia) Miķelis Lībietis
Israel F4 Futures	November 1	Ramat HaSharon	Israel	Hard	(United Kingdom) Daniel Cox	(Russia) Sergei Krotiouk / (Germany) Kevin Krawietz
Laos F1 Futures	November 1	Vientiane	Laos	Hard	(Thailand) Kittipong Wachiramanowong	(China) Gao Peng / (China) Gao Wan
Mexico F8 Futures	November 1	Guadalajara	Mexico	Clay	(United States) Roman Borvanov	(United States) Maciek Sykut / (United States) Denis Zivkovic
Paraguay F3 Futures	November 1	Encarnación	Paraguay	Clay	(Argentina) Juan-Pablo Amado	(Paraguay) Diego Galeano / (Paraguay) Daniel-Alejandro López
Spain F39 Futures	November 1	Vilafranca	Spain	Clay	(Spain) José Checa Calvo	(Spain) Carlos Rexach-Itoiz / (Spain) Gabriel Trujillo Soler
Turkey F14 Futures	November 1	Antalya	Turkey	Clay	(Austria) Michael Linzer	(Bulgaria) Tihomir Grozdanov / (Bulgaria) Alexandar Lazov
USA F29 Futures	November 1	Niceville, Florida	United States	Clay	(Hungary) Ádám Kellner	(United States) Robbye Poole / (Norway) Erling Tveit
Australia F11 Futures	November 8	Esperance	Australia	Hard	(Germany) Sebastian Rieschick	(Australia) Brydan Klein / (Australia) Nima Roshan
Brazil F32 Futures	November 8	Barueri	Brazil	Hard	(Brazil) Daniel Dutra da Silva	(Brazil) Víctor Maynard / (Brazil) Nicolás Santos
Chile F4 Futures	November 8	Santiago	Chile	Clay	(Croatia) Borut Puc	(Chile) Guillermo Rivera Aránguiz / (Chile) Cristóbal Saavedra Corvalán
Iran F6 Futures	November 8	Kish Island	Iran	Clay	(Croatia) Kristijan Mesaroš	(Italy) Enrico Burzi / (Italy) Walter Trusendi
Israel F5 Futures	November 8	Tel Aviv	Israel	Hard	(France) Grégoire Burquier	(France) Rudy Coco / (France) Fabrice Martin
Mexico F9 Futures	November 8	Durango	Mexico	Hard	(United States) Roman Borvanov	(United States) Roman Borvanov / (Mexico) Víctor Romero
Peru F1 Futures	November 8	Arequipa	Peru	Clay	(Argentina) Sebastián Decoud	(Uruguay) Martín Cuevas / (Argentina) Juan-Manuel Romanazzi
Thailand F4 Futures	November 8	Khon Kaen	Thailand	Hard	(Japan) Yūichi Sugita	(Indonesia) Christopher Rungkat / (Thailand) Kirati Siributwong
Turkey F15 Futures	November 8	Antalya	Turkey	Clay	(France) Gianni Mina	(Serbia) Ivan Bjelica / (Sweden) Patrik Brydolf
USA F30 Futures	November 8	Pensacola, Florida	United States	Clay	(Germany) Dennis Blömke	(Bulgaria) Dimitar Kutrovsky / (United States) Jack Sock
Brazil F33 Futures	November 15	Belo Horizonte	Brazil	Clay	(Brazil) Fernando Romboli	(Brazil) Guilherme Clézar / (Brazil) André Ghem
Chile F5 Futures	November 15	Quillota	Chile	Clay	(Chile) Guillermo Rivera Aránguiz	(Chile) Hans Podlipnik Castillo / (Chile) Ricardo Urzúa-Rivera
Czech Republic F4 Futures	November 15	Rožnov	Czech Republic	Carpet (i)	(Czech Republic) Jan Mertl	(Poland) Marcin Gawron / (Russia) Denis Matsukevich
Iran F7 Futures	November 15	Kish Island	Iran	Clay	(Ukraine) Artem Smirnov	(Austria) Gerald Melzer / (Croatia) Kristijan Mesaroš
New Zealand F1 Futures	November 15	Wellington	New Zealand	Hard	(Germany) Sebastian Rieschick	(Australia) Brydan Klein / (Australia) Dane Propoggia
Peru F2 Futures	November 15	Lima	Peru	Clay	(Argentina) Guido Andreozzi	(Argentina) Juan-Pablo Amado / (Uruguay) Martín Cuevas
Spain F40 Futures	November 15	Madrid	Spain	Clay	(Italy) Alessandro Giannessi	(Spain) Óscar Burrieza / (Spain) Javier Martí
Thailand F5 Futures	November 15	Nonthaburi	Thailand	Hard	(Japan) Yūichi Sugita	(India) Vijayant Malik / (India) Srirambalaji Narayanaswamy
USA F31 Futures	November 15	Amelia Island, Florida	United States	Clay	(Canada) Philip Bester	(Croatia) Mislav Hižak / (United States) Robbye Poole
Australia F12 Futures	November 22	Traralgon	Australia	Hard	(Israel) Amir Weintraub	(Australia) Colin Ebelthite / (Australia) Adam Feeney
Brazil F34 Futures	November 22	Foz do Iguaçu	Brazil	Clay	(Argentina) Juan-Pablo Villar	(Brazil) Guilherme Clézar / (Brazil) André Ghem
Chile F6 Futures	November 22	Rancagua	Chile	Clay	(Italy) Stefano Travaglia	(Chile) Guillermo Rivera Aránguiz / (Chile) Cristóbal Saavedra Corvalán
Czech Republic F5 Futures	November 22	Opava	Czech Republic	Carpet (i)	(Czech Republic) Jan Mertl	(Czech Republic) Michal Konečný / (Czech Republic) Daniel Lustig
Dominican Rep. F1 Futures	November 22	Santo Domingo	(Dominican Republic) Dominican Rep.	Hard	(Dominican Republic) Víctor Estrella	(Venezuela) Piero Luisi / (Venezuela) Román Recarte
Mexico F10 Futures	November 22	Colima	Mexico	Hard	(United States) James Ludlow	(Mexico) Daniel Garza / (United States) Chris Kwon
Peru F3 Futures	November 22	Lima	Peru	Clay	(Argentina) Juan-Pablo Amado	(Brazil) Diego Matos / (Argentina) Renzo Olivo
Sudan F1 Futures	November 22	Khartoum	Sudan	Clay	(Slovakia) Ivo Klec	(Spain) Jordi Muñoz Abreu / (Russia) Ivan Nedelko
Australia F13 Futures	November 29	Bendigo	Australia	Hard	(Australia) Samuel Groth	(Australia) Colin Ebelthite / (Australia) Adam Feeney
Chile F7 Futures	November 29	Talca	Chile	Clay	(Chile) Guillermo Hormazábal	(Chile) Guillermo Hormazábal / (Chile) Hans Podlipnik Castillo
Dominican Rep. F2 Futures	November 29	Santo Domingo	(Dominican Republic) Dominican Rep.	Hard	(Dominican Republic) Víctor Estrella	(France) Pierre-Hugues Herbert / (Germany) Kevin Krawietz
Mexico F11 Futures	November 29	Chiapas	Mexico	Hard	(Australia) Mark Verryth	(United States) Adam El Mihdawy / (United States) Ty Trombetta
Sudan F2 Futures	November 29	Khartoum	Sudan	Clay	(Slovakia) Ivo Klec	(Serbia) David Savić / (Bosnia and Herzegovina) Aldin Šetkić
Brazil F36 Futures	December 6	Araçatuba	Brazil	Clay	(Argentina) Facundo Bagnis	(Brazil) Marcelo Demoliner / (Brazil) Fernando Romboli
Chile F8 Futures	December 6	Concepción	Chile	Clay	(Croatia) Borut Puc	(Chile) Guillermo Rivera Aránguiz / (Chile) Cristóbal Saavedra Corvalán
Dominican Rep. F3 Futures	December 6	Santo Domingo	(Dominican Republic) Dominican Rep.	Hard	(Dominican Republic) Víctor Estrella	(France) Pierre-Hugues Herbert / (France) Romain Sichez
Mexico F12 Futures	December 6	Acapulco	Mexico	Clay	(Austria) Rainer Eitzinger	(Mexico) Luis Díaz Barriga / (Mexico) Miguel Ángel Reyes-Varela
Brazil F37 Futures	December 13	Guarulhos	Brazil	Clay	(Brazil) Fernando Romboli	(Brazil) Gabriel Dias / (Brazil) Leonardo Kirche
Chile F9 Futures	December 13	Concepción	Chile	Clay	(Chile) Cristóbal Saavedra Corvalán	(Chile) Javier Muñoz / (Chile) Juan Carlos Sáez
Cuba F1 Futures	December 13	Havana	Cuba	Hard	(Latvia) Deniss Pavlovs	(United Kingdom) Miles Bugby / (Canada) Kamil Pajkowski
Brazil F38 Futures	December 20	Sorocaba	Brazil	Clay	(Brazil) Fernando Romboli	(Brazil) Tiago Slonik / (Brazil) Thales Turini

== Top 25 players of the season ==
These tables present the number of singles (S) and doubles (D) titles won by each player, within all the tournaments of the 2010 ITF Futures series. The players are sorted by: 1) total number of titles; 2) a singles > doubles hierarchy; 3) alphabetical order (by family names for players).

Place	Total	Player	S	D
1.	12	Claudio Grassi (ITA)	3	9
2.	11	Andrés Molteni (ARG)	5	6
3.	10	Sebastian Rieschick (GER)	5	5
4.	9	Colin Ebelthite (AUS)	2	7
5.	8	Michail Elgin (RUS)	4	4
-.	8	Fernando Romboli (BRA)	4	4
-.	8	Matteo Viola (ITA)	4	4
8.	8	Javier Martí (ESP)	3	5
-.	8	Guillermo Rivera Aránguiz (CHI)	3	5
10.	8	Juho Paukku (FIN)	2	6
11.	7	Augustin Gensse (FRA)	7	0
12.	7	Kristijan Mesaroš (CRO)	6	1
13.	7	Florian Reynet (FRA)	4	3
14.	7	Philip Bester (CAN)	3	4
-.	7	Adrian Cruciat (ROU)	3	4
-.	7	Guillermo Hormazábal (CHI)	3	4
-.	7	Matwé Middelkoop (NED)	3	4
-.	7	João Sousa (POR)	3	4
19.	7	Harri Heliövaara (FIN)	2	5
-.	7	Miguel Ángel López Jaén (ESP)	2	5
-.	7	Cristóbal Saavedra-Corvalán (CHI)	2	5
-.	7	Mikhail Vasiliev (RUS)	2	5
23.	7	Adam Feeney (AUS)	0	7
-.	7	Gerard Granollers Pujol (ESP)	0	7
25.	6	Grégoire Burquier (FRA)	5	1
-.	6	Víctor Estrella (DOM)	5	1
-.	6	Sergio Gutiérrez-Ferrol (ESP)	5	1

== Point distribution ==
Points are awarded as follows:

Tournament Category	W	F	SF	QF	R16	R32	Q
Futures 15,000+H	35	20	10	4	1	0	0
Futures 15,000	27	15	8	3	1	0	0
Futures 10,000	18	10	6	2	1	0	0
