= 2009 Davis Cup Americas Zone Group III =

International tennis competition

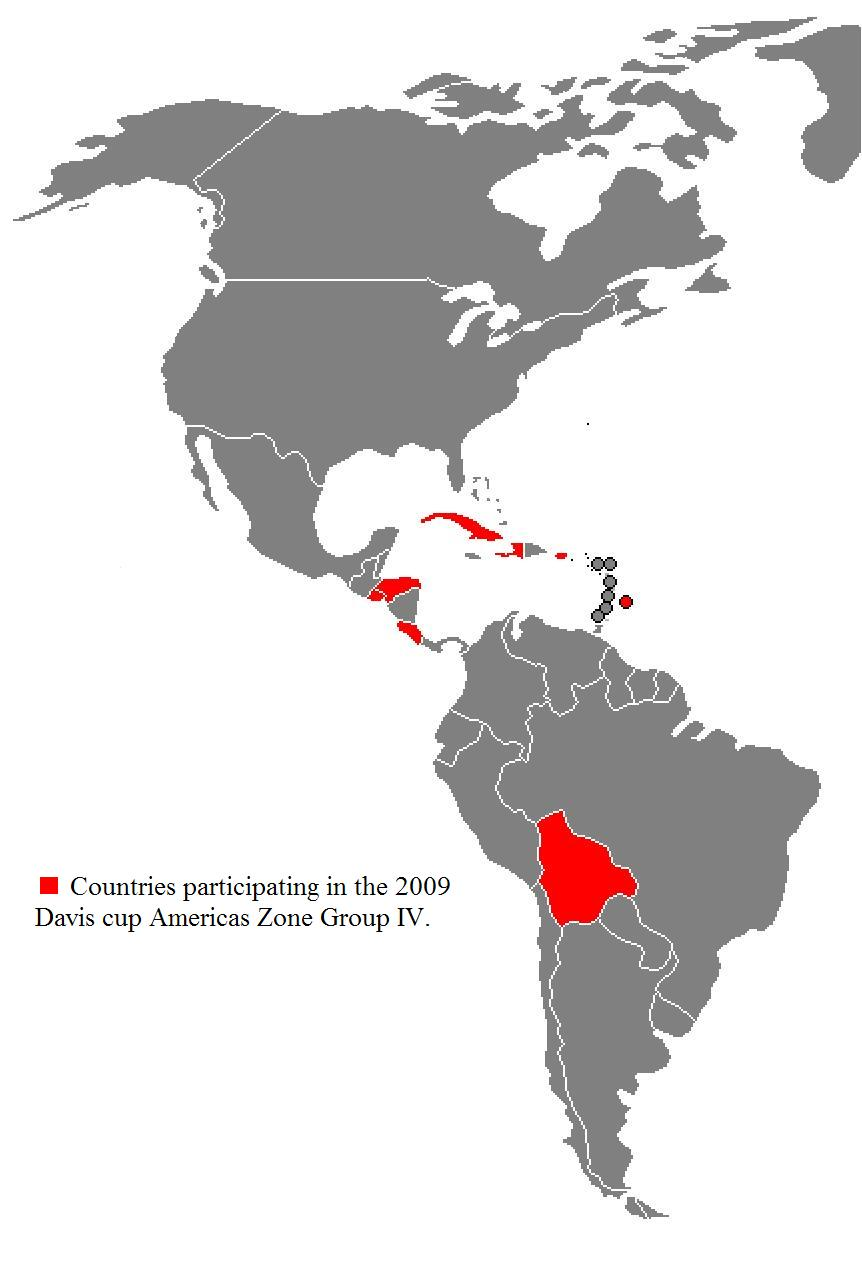
Countries participating in the 2009 Davis Cup Americas Zone Group III

The Americas Zone is one of the three zones of regional Davis Cup competition in 2009.

In the Americas Zone there are four different groups in which teams compete against each other to advance to the next group.

== Format ==
There will be a Round Robin with eight teams. The eight nations will be divided into two pools of four. The top two teams in each pool will advance to the Final Pool of four teams from which the two highest-placed nations are promoted to Americas Group II in 2010. The bottom two teams of each pool of the Round Robin will compete against each other in the Relegation Pool. The two lowest-placed nations are relegated to Americas Group IV in 2010.

== Information ==
Venue: La Libertad, El Salvador

Surface: Hard – outdoors

Dates: 22–26 April

== Participating teams ==
- Barbados
- Bolivia
- Costa Rica
- El Salvador
- Honduras
- Puerto Rico
- Cuba
- Haiti – withdrew

== Pool A ==
		ESA	BOL	BAR	HAI
1	El Salvador (2–0)		3–0	2–1	—
2	Bolivia (1–1)	0–3		2–1	—
3	Barbados (0–2)	1–2	1–2		—
4	Haiti (withdrew)	—	—	—	

=== Matches ===
==== El Salvador vs. Bolivia ====
El Salvador
3
Maya Country Club, La Libertad, El Salvador
22 April 2009
clay (outdoors)

Bolivia
0

			1	2	3
1	(El Salvador) (Bolivia)	Marcelo Arévalo; Mauricio Estívariz	6; 4	6; 4
2	(El Salvador) (Bolivia)	Rafael Arevalo; Mauricio Doria-Medina	6; 1	6; 1
3	(El Salvador) (Bolivia)	Marcelo Arévalo / Rafael Arevalo; Mauricio Estívariz / Mauricio Doria-Medina	5; 7	6; 4	6; 3

==== Bolivia vs. Barbados ====
Bolivia
2
Maya Country Club, La Libertad, El Salvador
23 April 2009
clay (outdoors)

Barbados
1

			1	2	3
1	(Bolivia) (Barbados)	Mauricio Estívariz; Darian King	6; 0	6; 0
2	(Bolivia) (Barbados)	Mauricio Doria-Medina; Haydn Lewis	4; 6	5; 7
3	(Bolivia) (Barbados)	Mauricio Estívariz / Jose-Roberto Velasco; Haydn Lewis / Russell Moseley	6; 1	4; 6	6; 1

==== El Salvador vs. Barbados ====
El Salvador
2
Maya Country Club, La Libertad, El Salvador
24 April 2009
clay (outdoors)

Barbados
1

			1	2	3
1	(El Salvador) (Barbados)	Rodrigo Rappaccioli; Darian King	6; 3	5; 7	3; 6
2	(El Salvador) (Barbados)	Rafael Arevalo; Haydn Lewis	6; 3	6; 1
3	(El Salvador) (Barbados)	Marcelo Arévalo / Rafael Arevalo; Haydn Lewis / Russell Moseley	4; 6	6; 3	6; 4

== Pool B ==
		CUB	PUR	CRC	HON
1	Cuba (3–0)		3–0	3–0	3–0
2	Puerto Rico (2–1)	0–3		2–1	2–1
3	Costa Rica (1–2)	0–3	1–2		3–0
4	Honduras (0–3)	0–3	1–2	0–3	

=== Cuba vs. Costa Rica ===
Cuba
3
Maya Country Club, La Libertad, El Salvador
22 April 2009
clay (outdoors)

Costa Rica
0

			1	2	3
1	(Cuba) (Costa Rica)	William Dorantes Sanchez; Ignaci Roca	6; 1	7; 5
2	(Cuba) (Costa Rica)	Edgar Hernandez-Perez; Federico Chavarría	7; 5	6; 4
3	(Cuba) (Costa Rica)	Favel-Antonio Freyre-Perdomo / Sandor Martínez-Breijo; Federico Chavarría / Fernando Martínez-Manrique	7^{7} 6^{1}	7^{7} 6^{4}

=== Honduras vs. Puerto Rico ===
Honduras
1
Maya Country Club, La Libertad, El Salvador
22 April 2009
clay (outdoors)

Puerto Rico
2

			1	2	3
1	(Honduras) (Puerto Rico)	Keny Turcios; Gilberto Alvarez	2; 6	7; 5	7^{7} 6^{5}
2	(Honduras) (Puerto Rico)	Alejandro Obando; Jose Emilio Sierra-Short	3; 6	6; 3	2; 6
3	(Honduras) (Puerto Rico)	Alejandro Obando / Keny Turcios; Gilberto Alvarez / Ricardo Gonzalez-Diaz	3; 6	1; 6

=== Honduras vs. Costa Rica ===
Honduras
0
Maya Country Club, La Libertad, El Salvador
23 April 2009
clay (outdoors)

Costa Rica
3

			1	2	3
1	(Honduras) (Costa Rica)	Keny Turcios; Federico Chavarría	6; 4	7; 5
2	(Honduras) (Costa Rica)	Alejandro Obando; Fernando Martínez-Manrique	6; 1	6; 4
3	(Honduras) (Costa Rica)	Alejandro Obando / Ricardo Pineda; Fernando Martínez-Manrique / Ignaci Roca	6; 0	6; 1

=== Cuba vs. Puerto Rico ===
Cuba
3
Maya Country Club, La Libertad, El Salvador
23 April 2009
clay (outdoors)

Puerto Rico
0

			1	2	3
1	(Cuba) (Puerto Rico)	William Dorantes Sanchez; Jose Emilio Sierra-Short	6; 2	6; 0
2	(Cuba) (Puerto Rico)	Edgar Hernandez-Perez; Ricardo Gonzalez-Diaz	6; 4	4; 6	6; 3
3	(Cuba) (Puerto Rico)	Favel-Antonio Freyre-Perdomo / Sandor Martínez-Breijo; Gilberto Alvarez / Gabriel Flores Ruiz	6; 3	6; 4

=== Puerto Rico vs. Costa Rica ===
Puerto Rico
2
Maya Country Club, La Libertad, El Salvador
24 April 2009
clay (outdoors)

Costa Rica
1

			1	2	3
1	(Puerto Rico) (Costa Rica)	Gilberto Alvarez; Ignaci Roca	7^{7} 6^{4}	6; 3
2	(Puerto Rico) (Costa Rica)	Ricardo Gonzalez-Diaz; Federico Chavarría	6; 4	6^{6} 7^{8}	7^{7} 6^{1}
3	(Puerto Rico) (Costa Rica)	Gabriel Flores Ruiz / Jose Emilio Sierra-Short; Ignaci Roca / Pablo Nunez	7^{7} 6^{5}	4; 6	6^{4} 7^{7}

=== Honduras vs. Cuba ===
Honduras
0
Maya Country Club, La Libertad, El Salvador
24 April 2009
clay (outdoors)

Cuba
3

			1	2	3
1	(Honduras) (Cuba)	Keny Turcios; William Dorantes Sanchez	1; 6	1; 6
2	(Honduras) (Cuba)	Alejandro Obando; Edgar Hernandez-Perez	0; 6	2; 6
3	(Honduras) (Cuba)	Alejandro Obando / Ricardo Pineda; Favel-Antonio Freyre-Perdomo / Sandor Martínez-Breijo	2; 6	4; 6

== Promotion Pool (1st to 4th Play-off) ==
		ESA	BOL	CUB	PUR
1	El Salvador (3–0)		3–0	3–0	3–0
2	Bolivia (2–1)	0–3		2–1	2–1
3	Cuba (1–2)	0–3	1–2		3–0
4	Puerto Rico (0–3)	0–3	1–2	0–3	

- The matches El Salvador-Bolivia and Cuba-Puerto Rico will not be played as they already played against each other in the previous round. Furthermore, the points gained at the matches played in the previous round will count for the table.

=== Matches ===
==== El Salvador vs. Cuba ====
El Salvador
3
Maya Country Club, La Libertad, El Salvador
25 April 2009
clay (outdoors)

Cuba
0

			1	2	3
1	(El Salvador) (Cuba)	Marcelo Arévalo; William Dorantes Sanchez	6; 3	7; 5
2	(El Salvador) (Cuba)	Rafael Arevalo; Edgar Hernandez-Perez	6; 0	6; 3
3	(El Salvador) (Cuba)	Marcelo Arévalo / Rodrigo Rappaccioli; Favel-Antonio Freyre-Perdomo / Sandor Martínez-Breijo	7^{7} 6^{1}	6; 4

==== Puerto Rico vs. Bolivia ====
Puerto Rico
1
Maya Country Club, La Libertad, El Salvador
25 April 2009
clay (outdoors)

Bolivia
2

			1	2	3
1	(Puerto Rico) (Bolivia)	Gilberto Alvarez; Mauricio Estívariz	6^{5} 7^{7}	2; 6
2	(Puerto Rico) (Bolivia)	Ricardo Gonzalez-Diaz; Mauricio Doria-Medina	6^{1} 7^{7}	7; 5	7; 5
3	(Puerto Rico) (Bolivia)	Gilberto Alvarez / Ricardo Gonzalez-Diaz; Mauricio Estívariz / Jose-Roberto Velasco	2; 6	2; 6

==== El Salvador vs. Puerto Rico ====
El Salvador
3
Maya Country Club, La Libertad, El Salvador
26 April 2009
clay (outdoors)

Puerto Rico
0

			1	2	3
1	(El Salvador) (Puerto Rico)	Marcelo Arévalo; Gabriel Flores Ruiz	6; 2	6; 0
2	(El Salvador) (Puerto Rico)	Rafael Arevalo; Jose Emilio Sierra-Short	6; 0	6; 0
3	(El Salvador) (Puerto Rico)	Marcelo Arévalo / Rodrigo Rappaccioli; Gabriel Flores Ruiz / Jose Emilio Sierra-Short	6^{4} 7^{7}	6; 1	6; 3

==== Cuba vs. Bolivia ====
Cuba
1
Maya Country Club, La Libertad, El Salvador
26 April 2009
clay (outdoors)

Bolivia
2

			1	2	3
1	(Cuba) (Bolivia)	William Dorantes Sanchez; Mauricio Estívariz	4; 6	0; 6
2	(Cuba) (Bolivia)	Edgar Hernandez-Perez; Mauricio Doria-Medina	3; 6	0; 6
3	(Cuba) (Bolivia)	Favel-Antonio Freyre-Perdomo / Sandor Martínez-Breijo; Marco-Antonio Rojas / Jose-Roberto Velasco	6; 4	7^{7} 6^{2}

== Relegation Pool (5th to 7th Play-off) ==
		CRC	BAR	HON	HAI
1	Costa Rica (2–0)		2–1	3–0	—
2	Barbados (1–1)	1–2		3–0	—
3	Honduras (0–2)	0–3	0–3		—
4	Haiti (withdrew)	—	—	—	

- The match Costa Rica-Honduras will not be played as it has already been played in the previous round. Furthermore, the points gained at the match played in the previous round will count for the table.

=== Matches ===
==== Honduras vs. Barbados ====
Honduras
0
Maya Country Club, La Libertad, El Salvador
25 April 2009
clay (outdoors)

Barbados
3

			1	2	3
1	(Honduras) (Barbados)	Keny Turcios; Russell Moseley	7; 5	1; 6	1; 6
2	(Honduras) (Barbados)	Alejandro Obando; Haydn Lewis	2; 6	0; 6
3	(Honduras) (Barbados)	Marco Ricardo Osorio / Ricardo Pineda; Darian King / Seanon Williams	6^{2} 7^{7}	6; 4	0; 6

==== Costa Rica vs. Barbados ====
Costa Rica
2
Maya Country Club, La Libertad, El Salvador
26 April 2009
clay (outdoors)

Barbados
1

			1	2	3
1	(Costa Rica) (Barbados)	Federico Chavarría; Darian King	6; 2	6; 3
2	(Costa Rica) (Barbados)	Fernando Martínez-Manrique; Haydn Lewis	3; 6	3; 6
3	(Costa Rica) (Barbados)	Federico Chavarría / Fernando Martínez-Manrique; Haydn Lewis / Russell Moseley	3; 6	7^{7} 6^{4}	6; 2
