= Matías Silva =

Peruvian tennis player

- Country (sports): Peru
- Born: 31 March 1984 (age 42) Lima, Peru
- Plays: Right-Handed (two-handed backhand)
- Prize money: $16,540

Singles
- Career record: 5–4
- Career titles: 0
- Highest ranking: No. 643 (5 November 2007)

Doubles
- Career record: 2–3
- Career titles: 0
- Highest ranking: No. 529 (28 July 2008)
- Last updated on: 9 April 2018.

Matías Silva (born 31 March 1984) is a retired Peruvian tennis player.

Silva has a career high ATP singles ranking of 643 achieved on 5 November 2007. He also has a career high doubles ranking of 529 achieved on 28 July 2008.

He has been a member of the Peru Davis Cup team from 2004 until 2008, competing in the World Group first round tie in 2008 against Spain.

== ATP Challenger and ITF Futures finals ==
=== Singles: 2 (1–1) ===
ATP Challenger (0–0)
ITF Futures (1–1)

Result	W–L	Date	Tournament	Tier	Surface	Opponent	Score
Loss	0–1	May 2006	Celaya, Mexico	Futures	Hard	(Mexico) Juan Manuel Elizondo	1–6, 2–6
Win	1–1	Aug 2007	Lima, Peru	Futures	Clay	(Argentina) Guido Pella	7–6^{(8–6)}, 1–6, 6–4

=== Doubles: 7 (4–3) ===
ATP Challenger (0–0)
ITF Futures (4–3)

Result	W–L	Date	Tournament	Tier	Surface	Partner	Opponents	Score
Win	1–0	Sep 2006	Guayaquil, Ecuador	Futures	Clay	(Peru) Iván Miranda	(Ecuador) David González (Venezuela) Román Recarte	6–2, 6–4
Win	2–0	Aug 2007	Lima, Peru	Futures	Clay	(Peru) Mauricio Echazú	(Bolivia) Mauricio Doria-Medina (Bolivia) Mauricio Estívariz	6–4, 6–3
Loss	2–1	Aug 2007	Arequipa, Peru	Futures	Clay	(Colombia) Francisco Franco	(Argentina) Facundo Bagnis (Peru) Sergio Galdós	4–6, 6–7^{(7–9)}
Win	3–1	Aug 2007	Guayaquil, Ecuador	Futures	Hard	(Peru) Mauricio Echazú	(New Zealand) Rubin Statham (New Zealand) Adam Thompson	2–6, 6–4, 6–2
Loss	3–2	Sep 2007	Guayaquil, Ecuador	Futures	Hard	(El Salvador) Rafael Arévalo	(Chile) Borja Malo-Casado (Chile) Hans Podlipnik-Castillo	2–6, 6–3, 3–6
Loss	3–3	Oct 2007	Los Mochis, Mexico	Futures	Clay	(Peru) Mauricio Echazú	(Spain) Ignacio Coll Riudavets (Spain) Pablo Martín-Adalia	0–6, 4–6
Win	4–3	Jul 2008	Trujillo, Peru	Futures	Clay	(Peru) Mauricio Echazú	(Peru) Sergio Galdós (Argentina) Guido Pella	2–6, 6–1, [10–7]
