= Mauricio Echazú =

Peruvian tennis player

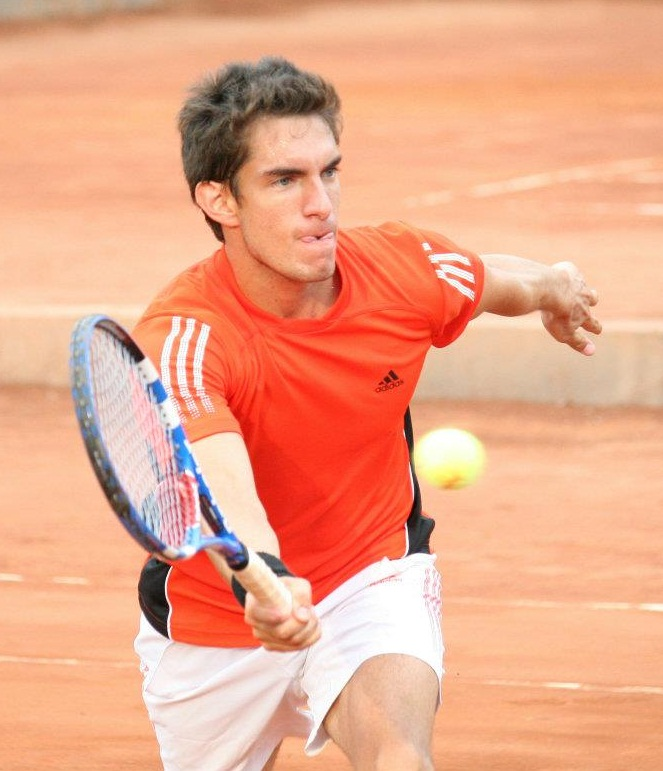
- Country (sports): Peru
- Residence: Lima, Peru
- Born: January 21, 1989 (age 37) Lima, Peru
- Height: 1.74 m (5 ft 9 in)
- Turned pro: 2006
- Plays: Right-handed (two-handed backhand)
- Prize money: US $135,005

Singles
- Career record: 15–16
- Career titles: 0
- Highest ranking: No. 379 (8 February 2010)
- Current ranking: No. 1,544 (10 August 2026)

Doubles
- Career record: 0-1
- Career titles: 0
- Highest ranking: No. 376 (13 October 2014)
- Current ranking: No. 1,622 (10 August 2026)
Medal record
Representing Peru
Men's tennis
Bolivarian Games
Silver medal – second place	2013 Trujillo	Men's Nations Cup
- Last updated on: 21 August 2026.

Mauricio Echazú Puente (Latin American Spanish: [mawˈɾisjo etʃaˈsu ˈpwente]; born January 2, 1989) is a Peruvian tennis player nicknamed "Garrita" ("Little Claw") because of his grinding playing style and fight spirit. He was a regular member of the Peruvian Davis Cup team.

In August 2021, Mauricio was provisionally suspended from the sport by International Tennis Integrity Agency (ITIA): from 6 August 2021, the player is prohibited from competing in or attending any sanctioned tennis events organised by the governing bodies of the sport due to match fixing investigations.

== Early career ==
=== 2004 ===
At fifteen years old, was selected to Peruvian Davis Cup team to play against Brazil, in Brasília, for Americas Zone Group I play-off tie. Lost to Brazilian Leonardo Kirche 2–6, 1–6 on clay in his first Davis Cup match ever.

=== 2005 ===
Once again was selected to Peruvian Davis Cup team to play against Paraguayan Davis Cup team, in Lima, for Americas Zone Group I play-off tie. Won to Paraguayan Enzo Pigola 6–4, 6–4 on clay.

== Professional tennis career ==
=== 2006 ===
Started to play satellite and futures tournaments to win his first ATP points. In Venezuela 1 Satellite Week 1 played on hard surface, qualified for first time to a main draw by winning three matches of qualifying draw. Although, lost to Brazilian Ricardo Hocevar in the first round. In the next weeks, qualified twice to main draw, however, lost in each first round. Months later, in Venezuela F1C played on hard surface, managed to qualify to main draw. won against Argentinian Martín Brocal in the first round winning his first ATP point. After that, won against Argentinian Juan-Manuel Agasarkissian in the second round. Then, lost to Colombian Michael Quintero 3–6, 2–6 in quarterfinals..

A month later, was accepted to Ecuador F1 main draw played on hard surface. won against Ecuadorian Gonzalo Escobar. Although, lost to Colombian Pablo González in the second round. In the next week, managed to qualify to Ecuador F2 main draw, however, lost to Iván Miranda.

Then, played four tournaments in Venezuela. In Venezuela F4 played on clay surface, lost to Jhonnatan Medina-Álvarez in the first round. However, in Venezuela F5 played on hard courts, won against Colombian Alejandro González. After that, won against Jhonnatan Medina-Álvarez in the second round. Also, defeated Benjamin Dracos in quarterfinals. Then, lost to David Navarrete in the semifinals. However, lost in first round in the other two Venezuelan tournaments.

At ending year, played two tournaments in Chile on clay surface. Lost both of them in first round. One of them to Chilean Jorge Aguilar.

=== 2007 ===
Began playing Panama F1 qualifying draw and managed to qualify to main draw. Lost to Argentinian Juan Pablo Amado in first round. After that, played Costa Rica F1 qualifying draw on hard surface. Lost to Canadian and eventual tourney Champ Peter Polansky.

Was selected to Peruvian Davis Cup team to play against Venezuelan Davis Cup team, in Lima, for Americas Zone Group I the first round. Lost to Venezuelan Román Recarte on clay. A month later, played the Salinas Challenger qualifying draw losing to Argentinian Gustavo Marcaccio in the first round. Once again was selected to Peruvian Davis Cup team to play against Mexican Davis Cup team, in Lima, for Americas Zone Group I the first round. Lost to Venezuelan Daniel Garza on clay.

He was also awarded a scholarship by the academy in Spain Sergi Bruguera. Country where he played five tournaments futures. In Spain F15 played on clay, lost to Pere Riba in the first round. Back to America, in Mexico F11 qualifying draw played on hard surface, lost to Ryan Harrison.

Finally, concluded his season playing Lima Challenger in which he lost to Luis Horna in the first round.

=== 2008 ===
Started his season playing El Salvador F1 main draw on clay in which he lost to Michael McClune 6–7^{(4)}, 6–7^{(2)} in the second round. Then, played Guatemala F1 main draw on hard courts in which he lost to Nicholas Monroe in the second round.

Was selected to Peruvian Davis Cup team to play against Spanish Davis Cup team, in Lima, for World Group the first round. Lost to Spaniard Tommy Robredo 4–6, 1–6 on clay in fourth rubber.

After that, played Colombia F4 on clay surface. There he won against Colombian Eduardo Struvay in the first round, but lost to Michael Quintero 3–6, 1–6 in the second round. Then, played Mexico F7 played on hard surface in which he lost to Australian and eventual tourney Champ Marinko Matosevic in the second round. Later, played Ecuador F1 in Quito. won against French Fabrice Martin in semifinals managing to play his first singles final. Lost to Ecuatorian Iván Endara 6–7^{(3)}, 3–6 in the final.

Once again was selected to Peruvian Davis Cup team to play against Israeli Davis Cup team, in Tel Aviv, for World Group Play-off. Played the doubles rubber alongside Matías Silva losing to Harel Levy and Australian Open 2008 Champ Andy Ram.

Finally, in his last tournament of year, Peru F5 played on clay, won against Duilio Beretta in the first round, however, lost to Argentinian Leandro Migani in the second round.

=== 2009 ===
During off-season he trained with Luis Horna and his coach Francisco Mastelli

Started his season playing El Salvador F1 on clay courts, losing to eventual tourney champ Adam Vejmelca. Then, played Guatemala F1 on hard surface in which he lost to eventual runner-up Holger Fischer 6–4, 6–7^{(3)}, 4–6. After that, played Costa Rica F1 on hard surface. won against Christopher Díaz Figueroa in the first round; won against Argentinian Juan-Manuel Valverde 6–4, 6–0 in the second round; won against Rylan Rizza 6–4, 6–2 in quarterfinals. Then, managed one of his best wins defeating Argentinian and Guatemala F1 champ Federico Delbonis in semifinals. Finally, could capture his first singles title defeating Latvian Adrians Zguns.

Was selected to Peruvian Davis Cup team to play against Ecuatorian Davis Cup team, in Quito, for Americas Zone Group I the first round. Played second rubber against ecuatorian Nicolás Lapentti losing in three sets. Once again was selected to Peruvian Davis Cup team to play against Canadian Davis Cup team, in Lima, for Americas Zone Group I Play-off, however, was not selected to play any rubber.

Next, he played Venezuela F4 on hard surface. He won against Miguel Cicenia in the first round; won against Román Recarte in the second round; won against Gonzalo Tur in quarterfinals; won against Piero Luisi 6–3, 6–2 in semifinals. Finally, could capture his 2nd singles title defeating Mexican Luis-Manuel Flores2-6, 6–4, 7–6^{(4)}. Next week, played Venezuela F5 also on hard surface. won against Tigre Hank in the first round; won against Venezuelan David Souto 6–4, 7–6^{(5)} in the second round; won against Colombian Michael Quintero. Finally, lost to Venezuelan Daniel Vallverdú in semifinals.

Also played Ecuador F2 on clay, losing to Ecuatorian Iván Endara 7–6^{(4)}, in semifinals. Then, played Ecuador F3 in Quito on clay. won against Iván Endara in quarterfinals and won against Marcelo Arévalo in semifinals. Finally, lost to Argentinian Facundo Bagnis in the final. After that, played Colombia F5 on clay, beating 6–3, 6–4 in the first round, however, lost to Colombian Alejandro González in quarterfinals.

Selected to Peruvian Davis Cup team to play against Uruguayan Davis Cup team, in Lima, for Americas Zone Group I Play-off, played second rubber against Uruguayan Pablo Cuevas losing in three sets. He defeated Uruguayan Ariel Behar in fourth rubber, though.

Later, played Quito Challenger main draw in which won against Ecuatorian Juan Sebastián Vivanco in the first round. Lost to Colombian Santiago Giraldo 4–6, 2–6 in the second round, though.

=== 2010 ===
At the end of January, managed to go to Guatemala F1 semifinals on hard surface losing to Iván Endara. Then, was selected to Peruvian Davis Cup team to play against El Salvador Davis Cup team, in Lima, for Americas Zone Group II the first round. Played second rubber against Salvadorian Marcelo Arévalo winning 2–6, 6–2, 6–4, 3–6, 6–3.

At the end of April, played Manta Challenger qualifying draw in which he defeated Croatian Tomislav Perić in final round. However, lost to Kevin Kim 3–6, 3–6 in first round. Once again was selected to Peruvian Davis Cup team to play against Venezuelan Davis Cup team, in Maracaibo, for Americas Zone Group II 2nd round. Played 1st rubber against Venezuelan David Souto losing in straight sets.

Echazú lost to Sebastián Decoud in Colombia F1 first round on clay. Then, played Colombia F2 on clay, defeating Eduardo Struvya in the first round and Nicolás Barrientos in the second round. He lost to Sebastián Decoud 3–6, 3–6 in quarterfinals. In Colombia F3 played on clay, also managed to go to semifinales in which he lost to Víctor Estrella, previously had won against Ecuatorian Emilio Gómez, though.

Also, played Bolivia F1 on clay. Lost to Adam El Mihdawy por 2–6, 0–4 RET because of hand injury in semifinals. After that, played three futures tournaments in Chile, all played on clay. In Chile F1, won against Gaston-Arturo Grimolizzi in quarterfinals and won against Cristóbal Saavedra Corvalán por 6–3, 0–6, 6–3 in semifinals. In the final, lost to Chilean Guillermo Rivera Aránguiz 2–6, 6–4, 5–7. Match in which Mauricio Echazú had had 2–6, 6–4, *5–4 serving for the match and even had had a couple of match points suffering chocking and then, lost it.

In Chile F2, he lost to Sergio Galdós in the second round. In Chile F3, he won against Gaston Giussani in the second round and won against Argentinian Diego Álvarez 3–6, 7–6^{(6)}, 6–4 before lost to Chilean Juan Carlos Sáez. Finally, played three futures tournaments in Peru, all played on clay. In Peru F1, defeated Sergio Galdós in the first round; defeated Martín Cuevas 3–6, 7–6^{(9)}, 6–2 in quarterfinals and then, defeated Duilio Beretta 3–6, 7–6^{(2)}, 6–4 in semifinals. However, lost to Sebastián Decoud 6–7^{(4)}, 6–7^{(5)} in the final. In Peru F2, lost to Argentinian Juan Pablo Amado in semifinals, previously had defeated Argentinian Renzo Olivo in quarterfinals, though. After that, in Peru F3, lost to Amado again 7–6^{(4)}, 1–6, 3–6, previously had won against Iván Miranda 6–2, 6–4 in quarterfinals, though.

=== 2011 ===
Started to play Colombia F1 on clay, losing to Gastão Elias in two sets. Then, played Colombia F2 on hard surface, losing to Sebastián Decoud 4–6, 4–6 in the second round.

Was selected to Peruvian Davis Cup team to play against Netherlands Antillean Davis Cup team, in Lima, for Americas Zone Group II the first round. Played second rubber against Netherlands Antillean Alexander Glom winning in three straight sets. Then, he played Barranquilla Challenger qualifying draw on clay. Defeated Brazilian Daniel Dutra da Silva in the first round qualification, but lost to Denis Zivkovic in final round qualification. After that, played Pereira Challenger qualifying draw on clay. won against Mexican Manuel Sánchez in the first round qualification, however, lost to Colombian Steffen Zornosa.

Later, played Chile F3 on clay surface in which he lost to Chilean Guillermo Hormazábal 2–6, 0–6 in semifinals. Previously, had defeated Uruguayan Marcel Felder 6–0, 6–4 in quarterfinals. A week after, played Venezuela F1 on hard surface, in which lost to Venezuelan David Souto 4–6, 6–3, 6–7^{(4)} in the final. Previously, had defeated Venezuelan Piero Luisi 6–4, 2–0 RET.

Once again was selected to Peruvian Davis Cup team to play against Dominican Republic Davis Cup team, in Lima, for Americas Zone Group II 2nd round. Was not selected to play any rubber, though. He was selected to Peruvian Davis Cup team to play against Paraguayan Davis Cup team, in Asunción, for Americas Zone Group II final round. Played 1st rubber against Paraguayan Daniel-Alejandro López winning 7–6^{(1)}, 7–5, 6–3 on clay. Then, played Cali Challenger main draw on clay. Lost to Argentinian Horacio Zeballos 1–6, 2–6 in first round. After that, played Venezuela F8 on hard surface, in which he lost to Canadian and eventual tournament champion Peter Polansky 5–7, 2–6 in quarterfinals. Had 2 set points at *5–4 serving for the first set, though.

Also, was selected and directly qualified to Pan American Games draw on hard courts as Peruvian athlete (tennis player). He lost to Marvin Rolle in first round, though. Played alongside Iván Miranda in doubles draw, lost Nicholas Monroe and Greg Ouellette in first round. After that, Mauricio Echazú competed in Buenos Aires Challenger (Copa Topper 2011) qualify draw. Won in straights sets to Argentinian Bruno Hamann 6–2, 6–4 in the first round qualification. He then won against Argentinian Guillermo Durán 6–3, 1–6, 7–6^{(5)} in the second round qualification. And finally, Echazú was defeated by Argentinian Diego Schwarztman in a three-set match in which Echazú had the upper hand for being 4–2 with a break point to serve out for the match in second set. Also, he was 4–2 up in the tie-break but could not keep his cool because of making a double fault.

Finally, ended his season playing Mexico F15 and Mexico F16. In the first one, played on hard courts, defeated Mexican Bruno Rodríguez in first round; then also defeated first seed Guatemalan Christopher Díaz Figueroa 6–4, 4–6, 7–5; however, lost to eventual Champ Colombian Nicolás Barrientos in quarterfinals. In the last tournament, played on clay, lost to eventual Champ Mexican César Ramírez in two sets.

=== 2012 ===
Echazú started his season playing Bucaramanga Challenger qualifying on clay. He won against Brazilian and last runner-up tournament Fernando Romboli and then, won against Colombian Michael Quintero managing to qualify for Bucaramanga Challenger Main Draw Singles. However, he lost to Chilean and seventh-seed Paul Capdeville.

== Equipment, apparel, endorsements ==
Echazú currently plays with a customised Babolat Pure Drive tennis racquet. He wears Adidas tennis outfit and footwear. Echazú endorses Cusqueña.

== Career future finals ==
=== Singles (2) ===
==== Titles ====
Legend Grand Slam (0) Tennis Masters Cup; ATP World Tour Finals (0) ATP Masters Series; ATP World Tour Masters 1000 (0) ATP International Series Gold; ATP World Tour 500 Series (0) ATP International Series; ATP World Tour 250 Series (0) ATP Challenger Tour (0) Future Tour (2)	Titles by surface Hard (2) Clay (0) Grass (0) Carpet (0)

No.	Date	Tournament	Surface	Opponent in the final	Score
1.	February 2, 2009	Costa Rica F1	Hard	(Latvia) Adrians Zguns	6–3, 3–6, 6–2
2.	July 13, 2009	Venezuela F4	Hard	(Mexico) Luis-Manuel Flores	2–6, 6–4, 7–6^{(4)}

==== Runners-up ====
Legend Grand Slam (0) Tennis Masters Cup; ATP World Tour Finals (0) ATP Masters Series; ATP World Tour Masters 1000 (0) ATP International Series Gold; ATP World Tour 500 Series (0) ATP International Series; ATP World Tour 250 Series (0) ATP Challenger Tour (0) Future Tour (5)	Runners-up by surface Hard (1) Clay (4) Grass (0) Carpet (0)

No.	Date	Tournament	Surface	Opponent in the final	Score
1.	August 11, 2008	Ecuador F1	Clay	(Ecuador) Iván Endara	6–7^{(3)}, 3–6
2.	August 17, 2009	Ecuador F3	Clay	(Argentina) Facundo Bagnis	5–7, 2–6
3.	October 18, 2010	Chile F1	Clay	(Chile) Guillermo Rivera Aránguiz	2–6, 6–4, 5–7
4.	November 8, 2010	Peru F1	Clay	(Argentina) Sebastián Decoud	6–7^{(4)}, 6–7^{(5)}
5.	April 25, 2011	Venezuela F1	Hard	(Venezuela) David Souto	4–6, 6–3, 6–7^{(4)}

=== Doubles (6) ===
==== Titles ====
Legend Grand Slam (0) Tennis Masters Cup; ATP World Tour Finals (0) ATP Masters Series; ATP World Tour Masters 1000 (0) ATP International Series Gold; ATP World Tour 500 Series (0) ATP International Series; ATP World Tour 250 Series (0) ATP Challenger Tour (0) Future Tour (6)	Titles by surface Hard (1) Clay (5) Grass (0) Carpet (0)

No.	Date	Tournament	Surface	Partner	Opponent in the final	Score
1.	August 6, 2007	Perú F2	Clay	(Peru) Matías Silva	(Bolivia) Mauricio Doria-Medina (Bolivia) Mauricio Estívariz	6–4, 6–3
2.	August 20, 2007	Ecuador F1	Hard	(Peru) Matías Silva	(New Zealand) José Statham (New Zealand) Adam Thompson	2–6, 6–4, 6–2
3.	July 15, 2008	Perú F3	Clay	(Peru) Matías Silva	(Peru) Sergio Galdós (Argentina) Guido Pella	2–6, 6–1, [10–7]
4.	August 18, 2010	Colombia F1	Clay	(United States) Maciek Sykut	(Mexico) Daniel Garza (United States) Dennis Zivkovic	3–6, 6–3, [10–8]
5.	September 13, 2010	Bolivia F1	Clay	(Peru) Sergio Galdós	(United States) Adam El Mihdawy (Bolivia) Eduardo Kohlberg-Ruíz	6–1, 6–4
6.	August 15, 2011	Peru F2	Clay	(Venezuela) Román Recarte	(Argentina) Guido Andreozzi (Uruguay) Martín Cuevas	5–7, 6–4, [10–5]

==== Runners-up ====
Legend Grand Slam (0) Tennis Masters Cup; ATP World Tour Finals (0) ATP Masters Series; ATP World Tour Masters 1000 (0) ATP International Series Gold; ATP World Tour 500 Series (0) ATP International Series; ATP World Tour 250 Series (0) ATP Challenger Tour (0) Future Tour (14)	Runners-up by surface Hard (3) Clay (11) Grass (0) Carpet (0)

No.	Date	Tournament	Surface	Partner	Opponent in the final	Score
1.	September 25, 2006	Venezuela F4	Clay	(Colombia) Sergio Ramírez	(Ecuador) Carlos Avellán (Ecuador) Julio César Campozano	6–7^{(0)}, 4–6
2.	October 15, 2007	México F9	Clay	(Peru) Matías Silva	(Spain) Ignacio Coll Riudavets (Spain) Pablo Martín-Adalia	0–6, 4–6
3.	August 11, 2008	Ecuador F3	Clay	(Ecuador) Sebastián Rivera	(Argentina) Juan-Manual Romanazzi (Argentina) Agustín Velotti	6–7^{(5)}, 3–6
4.	September 30, 2008	Ecuador F6	Clay	(Ecuador) Sebastián Rivera	(Ecuador) Iván Endara (Ecuador) Walter Valarezo	3–6, 6–2, [9–11]
5.	October 13, 2008	Chile F2	Clay	(Ecuador) Sebastián Rivera	(Romania) Catalin Ionut-Gard (Latvia) Deniss Pavlovs	6–3, 5–7, [2–10]
6.	November 11, 2008	Perú F5	Clay	(Ecuador) Iván Endara	(Argentina) Alejandro Kon (Argentina) Leandro Migani	4–6, 2–6
7.	May 18, 2009	Venezuela F2	Hard	(Ecuador) Iván Endara	(Colombia) Alejandro Gonzáles (Colombia) Eduardo Struvay	2–6, 5–7
8.	October 5, 2009	Venezuela F7	Clay	(Uruguay) Ariel Behar	(Peru) Francisco Carbajal (Colombia) Eduardo Struvay	3–6, 6–1 [8–10]
9.	October 19, 2009	Venezuela F9	Hard	(Uruguay) Ariel Behar	(Venezuela) Luis Davis Martínez (Venezuela) Yohny Romero	6–7^{(5)}, 5–7
10.	August 23, 2010	Colombia F2	Clay	(El Salvador) Marcelo Arévalo	(Ecuador) Iván Endara (Chile) Guillermo Rivera Aránguiz	6–2, 3–6, [7–10]
11.	September 27, 2010	Bolivia F3	Clay	(Peru) Sergio Galdós	(Bolivia) Mauricio Doria-Medina (Bolivia) Mauricio Estívariz	4–6, 4–6
12.	October 4, 2010	Bolivia F4	Clay	(Peru) Sergio Galdós	(Bolivia) Hugo Dellien (Bolivia) Federico Zeballos	1–6, 4–6
13.	November 9, 2010	Perú F1	Clay	(Peru) Francisco Carbajal	(Uruguay) Martín Cuevas (Argentina) Juan Manuel Romanazzi	4–6, 6–7^{(5)}
14.	April 25, 2011	Venezuela F1	Hard	(Peru) Sergio Galdós	(Venezuela) Piero Luisi (Venezuela) Román Recarte	6–4, 3–6, [7–10]

== Evolution in the ATP ranking (singles) ==
Changes in the ranking ATP to the end of the season.

Year	2006	2007	2008	2009	2010	2011	2012	2013
Singles ranking	990	▼1238	▲666	▲402	▼481	▼590	▲509	▲508
