= Tennis tournaments in Chile =

Tennis tournament in Chile is divided into 3 categories, Futures tournaments, ATP Challenger Series, ATP 250 Series.These tournaments are played on clay and consist of 9 tournaments played on the year in the cities of Antofagasta, Concepción, Iquique, Viña del Mar and Santiago. Of all tournaments played, the most important is the Movistar Open.

== Tournament ==
=== By Category ===
Category
ATP 250 Series (1)
ATP Challenger Series (3)
ITA Futures Series (6)

=== Tournament ===
No.	Date	Tournament	Surface	2009 Champion	City
1.		(Chile) Challenger ATP Iquique	Clay	(Argentina) Máximo González	Iquique
2.		(Chile) Movistar Open	Clay	(Chile) Fernando González	Santiago
3.		(Chile) Challenger de Providencia	Clay	(Argentina) Máximo González	Santiago
4.		Chile F1 Futures	Clay	(Chile) Jorge Aguilar	Antofagasta
5.		Chile F2 Futures	Clay	(Italy) Antonio Comporto	Santiago
6.		(Chile) Copa Petrobras Santiago	Clay	(Argentina) Eduardo Schwank	Santiago
7.		Chile F3 Futures	Clay	(Peru) Iván Miranda	Santiago
8.		Chile F4 Futures	Clay	(Chile) Jorge Aguilar	Santiago
9.		Chile F5 Futures	Clay	(Chile) Jorge Aguilar	Santiago
10.		Chile F6 Futures	Clay	(Chile) Adrián García	Concepción

=== Former Tournament ===
No.	Last Edition	Tournament	Surface	Last Champion	City
1.	2004	Chile F1A Futures	Clay	(Chile) Julio Peralta	Santiago
2.	2004	Chile F1B Futures	Clay	(Argentina) Cristian Villagrán	Santiago
3.	2005	Chile F7 Futures	Clay	(Argentina) Leandro Migani	Antofagasta
4.	2000	Chile F8 Futures	Clay	(Argentina) Daniel Caracciolo	Viña del Mar
5.	2000	Chile F9 Futures	Clay	(Argentina) Patricio Rudi	Santiago
6.	2008	(Chile) ATP Challenger La Serena	Clay	(Spain) Rubén Ramírez Hidalgo	La Serena
