= 2009 Davis Cup Americas Zone Group IV =

International tennis competition

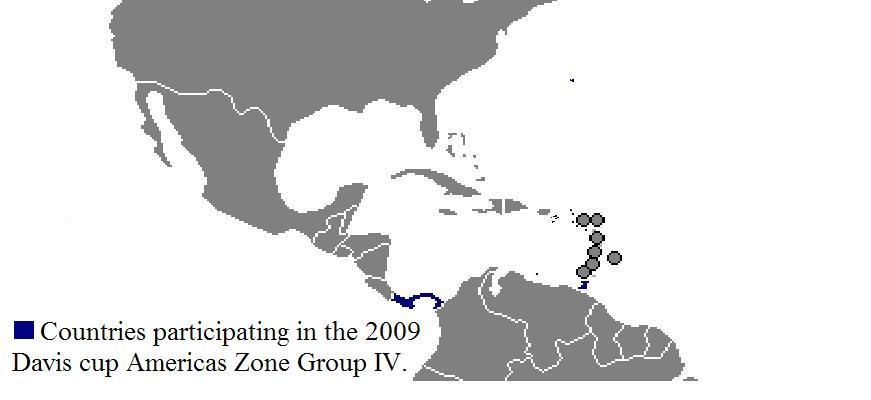
Countries participating in the 2009 Davis Cup Americas Zone Group IV

The Americas Zone is one of the three zones of regional Davis Cup competition in 2009.

In the Americas Zone there are four different groups in which teams compete against each other to advance to the next group.

== Format ==
The five teams will compete against each other in a Round Robin pool. The top two nations will be promoted to Americas Group III in 2010.

== Information ==
Venue: La Libertad, El Salvador

Surface: Hard – outdoors

Dates: 22–26 April

== Participating teams ==
- Aruba
- Bermuda
- U.S. Virgin Islands
- Panama
- Trinidad and Tobago

== Round robin ==
		ARU	BER	ISV	TRI	PAN
1	Aruba (4–0)		2–1	2–1	2–1	2–1
2	Bermuda (3–1)	1–2		2–1	2–1	3–0
3	U.S. Virgin Islands (2–2)	1–2	1–2		2–1	2–1
4	Trinidad and Tobago (1–3)	1–2	1–2	1–2		2–1
5	Panama (0–4)	1–2	0–3	1–2	1–2	

=== Matches ===
==== Bermuda vs. Aruba ====
Bermuda
1
Maya Country Club, La Libertad, El Salvador
22 April 2009
clay (outdoors)

Aruba
2

			1	2	3
1	(Bermuda) (Aruba)	Gavin Menders; Mitchell de Jong	6; 3	6; 1
2	(Bermuda) (Aruba)	Jenson Bascome; Gian Hodgson	3; 6	6; 7
3	(Bermuda) (Aruba)	Gavin Menders / Jenson Bascome; Gian Hodgson / Harry Van Reek	6; 4	4; 6	6; 7

==== US Virgin Islands vs. Panama ====
U.S. Virgin Islands
2
Maya Country Club, La Libertad, El Salvador
22 April 2009
clay (outdoors)

Panama
1

			1	2	3
1	(United States Virgin Islands) (Panama)	Brian Karlson Oldfield; Giuseppe Guarnieri	0; 6	2; 6
2	(United States Virgin Islands) (Panama)	Kristepher Elien; Luis Fernando Garcia	4; 6	6; 1	6; 2
3	(United States Virgin Islands) (Panama)	Kristepher Elien / Brian Karlson Oldfield; Walner Espinoza / Jose Gilbert Gomez	7; 6	6; 2

==== Aruba vs. US Virgin Islands ====
Aruba
2
Maya Country Club, La Libertad, El Salvador
23 April 2009
clay (outdoors)

U.S. Virgin Islands
1

			1	2	3
1	(Aruba) (United States Virgin Islands)	Mitchell de Jong; Terrance Eugene Highfield	6; 3	6; 4
2	(Aruba) (United States Virgin Islands)	Gian Hodgson; Kristepher Elien	2; 6	6; 1	6; 7
3	(Aruba) (United States Virgin Islands)	Gian Hodgson / Harry Van Reek; Kristepher Elien / Terrance Eugene Highfield	1; 6	7; 6	6; 4

==== Bermuda vs. Trinidad & Tobago ====
Bermuda
2
Maya Country Club, La Libertad, El Salvador
23 April 2009
clay (outdoors)

Trinidad and Tobago
1

			1	2	3
1	(Bermuda) (Trinidad and Tobago)	Gavin Manders; Vaughn Wilson	6; 2	6; 2
2	(Bermuda) (Trinidad and Tobago)	Jenson Bascome; Richard Chung	6; 7	6; 7
3	(Bermuda) (Trinidad and Tobago)	Jenson Bascome / Gavin Manders; Richard Chung / Jerome Ward	6; 2	6; 1

==== Panama vs. Trinidad & Tobago ====
Panama
1
Maya Country Club, La Libertad, El Salvador
24 April 2009
clay (outdoors)

Trinidad and Tobago
2

			1	2	3
1	(Panama) (Trinidad and Tobago)	Giuseppe Guarnieri; Jerome Ward	6; 3	6; 7	6; 4
2	(Panama) (Trinidad and Tobago)	Luis Fernando Garcia; Richard Chung	2; 6	6; 7
3	(Panama) (Trinidad and Tobago)	Walner Espinoza / Luis Fernando Garcia; Richard Chung / Vaughn Wilson	4; 6	2; 6

==== US Virgin Islands vs. Bermuda ====
U.S. Virgin Islands
1
Maya Country Club, La Libertad, El Salvador
24 April 2009
clay (outdoors)

Bermuda
2

			1	2	3
1	(United States Virgin Islands) (Bermuda)	Terrance Eugene Highfield; Gavin Manders	3; 6	6; 3	6; 7
2	(United States Virgin Islands) (Bermuda)	Kristepher Elien; Jenson Bascome	6; 4	6; 2
3	(United States Virgin Islands) (Bermuda)	Kristepher Elien / Terrance Eugene Highfield; Jenson Bascome / Gavin Manders	4; 6	6; 4	3; 6

==== Aruba vs. Panama ====
Aruba
2
Maya Country Club, La Libertad, El Salvador
25 April 2009
clay (outdoors)

Panama
1

			1	2	3
1	(Aruba) (Panama)	Mitchell de Jong; Giuseppe Guarnieri	5; 7	2; 6
2	(Aruba) (Panama)	Gian Hodgson; Walner Espinoza	6; 1	6; 0
3	(Aruba) (Panama)	Gian Hodgson / Harry Van Reek; Walner Espinoza / Jose Gilbert Gomez	6; 3	6; 3

==== US Virgin Islands vs. Trinidad & Tobago ====
U.S. Virgin Islands
2
Maya Country Club, La Libertad, El Salvador
25 April 2009
clay (outdoors)

Trinidad and Tobago
1

			1	2	3
1	(United States Virgin Islands) (Trinidad and Tobago)	Brian Karlsson Oldfield; Jerome Ward	4; 6	6; 1	6; 2
2	(United States Virgin Islands) (Trinidad and Tobago)	Kristepher Elien; Richard Chung	6; 3	6; 2
3	(United States Virgin Islands) (Trinidad and Tobago)	Kemit-Amon Francis Lewis / Brian Karlsson Oldfield; Richard Chung / Vaughn Wilson	1; 6	3; 6

==== Panama vs. Bermuda ====
Panama
0
Maya Country Club, La Libertad, El Salvador
26 April 2009
clay (outdoors)

Bermuda
3

			1	2	3
1	(Panama) (Bermuda)	Jose Gilbert Gomez; Gavin Manders	2; 6	4; 6
2	(Panama) (Bermuda)	Giuseppe Guarnieri; Jenson Bascome	6; 2	3; 6	6 retired 6
3	(Panama) (Bermuda)	Walner Espinoza / Jose Gilbert Gomez; Nicholas Thuell / Jacob Trott	6; 7	3; 6

==== Aruba vs. Trinidad & Tobago ====
Aruba
2
Maya Country Club, La Libertad, El Salvador
26 April 2009
clay (outdoors)

Trinidad and Tobago
1

			1	2	3
1	(Aruba) (Trinidad and Tobago)	Harry Van Reek; Jerome Ward	4; 6	7; 6	3; 6
2	(Aruba) (Trinidad and Tobago)	Gian Hodgson; Richard Chung	4; 6	6; 2	7 retired 5
3	(Aruba) (Trinidad and Tobago)	Mitchell de Jong / Harry Van Reek; Richard Chung / Vaughn Wilson	6; 1	6; 4
