= Mauricio Estívariz =

Bolivian tennis player

- Country (sports): Bolivia
- Born: 9 September 1986 (age 39)
- Prize money: $19,444

Singles
- Career record: 10–9 (Davis Cup)
- Highest ranking: No. 653 (14 September 2009)

Doubles
- Career record: 8–4 (Davis Cup)
- Highest ranking: No. 596 (5 May 2009)

Mauricio Estívariz (born 9 September 1986) is a Bolivian former professional tennis player.

Estívariz, who had a best singles world ranking of 653, was a regular member of the Bolivia Davis Cup team between 2004 and 2010, winning 18 of his 31 rubbers. He was also a Bolivarian Games gold medalist for Bolivia.

In 2011, as his tennis career was winding down, he trialled for La Paz FC as a goalkeeper.

Estívariz served as non-playing captain of Bolivia in the 2018 Davis Cup.

== ITF Futures finals ==
=== Singles: 2 (0–2) ===
Result	W–L	Date	Tournament	Surface	Opponent	Score
Loss	0–1	Jul 2009	Romania F11, Oradea	Clay	(Hungary) György Balázs	3–6, 0–6
Loss	0–2	Oct 2010	Bolivia F3, Cochabamba	Clay	(Argentina) Diego Schwartzman	4–6, 5–7

=== Doubles: 7 (3–4) ===
Result	W–L	Date	Tournament	Surface	Partner	Opponents	Score
Loss	0–1	Aug 2007	Peru F2, Lima	Clay	(Bolivia) Mauricio Doria-Medina	(Peru) Mauricio Echazú (Peru) Matías Silva	4–6, 3–6
Loss	0–2	Sep 2007	Bolivia F2, Cochabamba	Clay	(Bolivia) Mauricio Doria-Medina	(Argentina) Facundo Bagnis (Argentina) Agustín Picco	3–6, 3–6
Win	1–2	Oct 2008	Bolivia F4, Tarija	Clay	(Bolivia) Jose-Roberto Velasco	(Bolivia) Mauricio Doria-Medina (Estonia) Mait Künnap	6–0, 6–3
Win	2–2	Sep 2009	Bolivia F3, La Paz	Clay	(Bolivia) Federico Zeballos	(Bolivia) Mauricio Doria-Medina (Argentina) Agustín Picco	6–4, 3–6, [10–7]
Loss	2–3	Sep 2009	Bolivia F4, Tarija	Clay	(Bolivia) Federico Zeballos	(Argentina) Facundo Bagnis (Argentina) Guillermo Carry	2–6, 2–6
Win	3–3	Oct 2010	Bolivia F3, Cochabamba	Clay	(Bolivia) Mauricio Doria-Medina	(Peru) Mauricio Echazú (Peru) Sergio Galdós	6–4, 6–4
Loss	3–4	Oct 2012	Bolivia F4, La Paz	Clay	(Bolivia) Federico Zeballos	(Guatemala) Christopher Díaz Figueroa (Colombia) Sebastian Serrano	5–7, 5–7
