= Román Recarte =

Venezuelan tennis player (born 1987)

Roman Recarte
- Country (sports): Venezuela
- Born: 7 June 1987 (age 39)
- Prize money: $41,300 USD

Singles
- Career record: 3-4 (ATP Tour level, Grand Slam level, and Davis Cup)
- Career titles: 0
- Highest ranking: No. 492 (17 October 2011)

Doubles
- Career record: 0-1 (ATP Tour level, Grand Slam level, and Davis Cup)
- Career titles: 0
- Highest ranking: No. 381 (21 November 2011)
- Last updated on: 2 April 2026.

Román Recarte (Spanish pronunciation: [roˈman reˈkaɾte]; b. Caracas, 7 June 1987) is a tennis player from Venezuela. He has represented Venezuela in the Davis Cup between 2007 and 2012.

== Sources ==
- Román Recarte at the Association of Tennis Professionals
- Román Recarte at World Tennis
