= Mauricio Doria-Medina =

Bolivian tennis player

- Country (sports): Bolivia
- Born: 22 September 1988 (age 36); Cochabamba, Bolivia
- Plays: Left-handed
- Prize money: $31,218

Singles
- Career record: 10–9 (Davis Cup)
- Highest ranking: No. 664 (20 April 2009)

Doubles
- Career record: 6–4 (Davis Cup)
- Highest ranking: No. 359 (19 July 2010)
Medal record
South American Games
Silver medal – second place	2006 Buenos Aires	Singles

Mauricio Doria-Medina (born 22 September 1988) is a former Bolivian professional tennis player.

A left-handed player from Cochabamba, Doria-Medina was a silver medalist for Bolivia at the 2006 South American Games in Buenos Aires, as the runner-up in the singles tournament, to Brazil's Nicolas Santos. He also represented Bolivia at the 2007 and 2011 editions of the Pan American Games.

Doria-Medina, who won 12 ITF Futures titles, competed in 20 Davis Cup ties for Bolivia between 2007 and 2012.
