= 2012 ITF Men's Circuit (October–December) =

The 2012 ITF Men's Circuit is the 2012 edition of the third tier tour for men's professional tennis. It is organised by the International Tennis Federation and is a tier below the ATP Challenger Tour. During the months of October 2012 and December 2012 over tournaments were played with the majority being played in the month of .

== October ==
Week of	Tournament	Winner	Runners-up	Semifinalists	Quarterfinalists
October 1	Australia F9 Futures; Esperance, Australia; Hard $15,000; Singles draw - Doubles draw	(Australia) Adam Feeney; 3–6, 7–6^{(7–2)}, 6–2	(Australia) Alex Bolt	(Australia) Benjamin Mitchell (Australia) Luke Saville	(Australia) Gavin van Peperzeel (India) Saketh Myneni (Australia) James Lemke (New Zealand) Michael Venus
October 1	Australia F9 Futures; Esperance, Australia; Hard $15,000; Singles draw - Doubles draw	(Australia) Alex Bolt (Australia) Benjamin Mitchell; 6–2, 6–3	(Australia) Adam Feeney (Australia) Zach Itzstein	(Australia) Benjamin Mitchell (Australia) Luke Saville	(Australia) Gavin van Peperzeel (India) Saketh Myneni (Australia) James Lemke (New Zealand) Michael Venus
October 1	Bolivia F4 Futures; La Paz, Bolivia; Clay $10,000; Singles draw - Doubles draw	(Bolivia) Federico Zeballos; 6–2, 6–4	(Argentina) José María Páez	(Japan) Ryusei Makiguchi (Peru) Sergio Galdós	(Guatemala) Christopher Díaz Figueroa (Argentina) Juan Ignacio Galarza (Argentina) Facundo Mena (Bolivia) Mauricio Doria-Medina
October 1	Bolivia F4 Futures; La Paz, Bolivia; Clay $10,000; Singles draw - Doubles draw	(Guatemala) Christopher Díaz Figueroa (Colombia) Sebastián Serrano; 7–5, 7–5	(Bolivia) Mauricio Estívariz (Bolivia) Federico Zeballos	(Japan) Ryusei Makiguchi (Peru) Sergio Galdós	(Guatemala) Christopher Díaz Figueroa (Argentina) Juan Ignacio Galarza (Argentina) Facundo Mena (Bolivia) Mauricio Doria-Medina
October 1	Brazil F28 Futures; São José dos Campos, Brazil; Clay $10,000; Singles draw - Doubles draw	(Brazil) Carlos Eduardo Severino; 4–3 Ret.	(Brazil) Caio Silva	(Brazil) Eduardo Dischinger (Brazil) Guilherme Hadlich	(Brazil) Daniel Dutra da Silva (Brazil) Andrew Lauret (Brazil) Alexandre Schnitman (Brazil) Gustavo Guerses
October 1	Brazil F28 Futures; São José dos Campos, Brazil; Clay $10,000; Singles draw - Doubles draw	(Brazil) Wilson Leite (Brazil) Carlos Eduardo Severino; 6–3, 4–6, [10–5]	(Uruguay) Martín Cuevas (Brazil) Caio Silva	(Brazil) Eduardo Dischinger (Brazil) Guilherme Hadlich	(Brazil) Daniel Dutra da Silva (Brazil) Andrew Lauret (Brazil) Alexandre Schnitman (Brazil) Gustavo Guerses
October 1	Colombia F4 Futures; Villavicencio, Colombia; Clay $15,000; Singles draw - Doubles draw	(Argentina) Patricio Heras; 7–6^{(9–7)}, 6–4	(Colombia) Alejandro González	(Chile) Guillermo Hormazábal (Argentina) José María Paniagua	(Australia) Matheson Klein (Dominican Republic) José Hernández (Australia) Yuri Bezeruk (Colombia) Felipe Escobar
October 1	Colombia F4 Futures; Villavicencio, Colombia; Clay $15,000; Singles draw - Doubles draw	(Australia) Yuri Bezeruk (Australia) Matheson Klein; 6–2, 6–4	(Mexico) Tigre Hank (Colombia) Steffen Zornosa	(Chile) Guillermo Hormazábal (Argentina) José María Paniagua	(Australia) Matheson Klein (Dominican Republic) José Hernández (Australia) Yuri Bezeruk (Colombia) Felipe Escobar
October 1	France F19 Futures; Nevers, France; Hard $15,000+H; Singles draw - Doubles draw	(France) Nicolas Renavand; 7–6^{(7–4)}, 6–3	(France) Albano Olivetti	(France) David Guez (Republic of Ireland) James McGee	(Hungary) Márton Fucsovics (France) Mathieu Rodrigues (France) Pierre-Hugues Herbert (France) Vincent Millot
October 1	France F19 Futures; Nevers, France; Hard $15,000+H; Singles draw - Doubles draw	(France) Yannick Jankovits (France) Alexandre Sidorenko; 6–2, 6–2	(France) Constantin Belot (France) Vincent Millot	(France) David Guez (Republic of Ireland) James McGee	(Hungary) Márton Fucsovics (France) Mathieu Rodrigues (France) Pierre-Hugues Herbert (France) Vincent Millot
October 1	Germany F18 Futures; Leimen, Germany; Hard $10,000; Singles draw - Doubles draw	(Germany) Stefan Seifert; 6–3, 3–6, 6–2	(Switzerland) Sandro Ehrat	(Switzerland) Riccardo Maiga (Finland) Timo Nieminen	(Switzerland) Alexander Sadecky (France) Davy Sum (Slovakia) Adrian Sikora (Russia) Alexey Vatutin
October 1	Germany F18 Futures; Leimen, Germany; Hard $10,000; Singles draw - Doubles draw	(Poland) Marcin Gawron (Poland) Grzegorz Panfil; 6–3, 6–4	(Germany) Sascha Lehmann (Chile) Laslo Urrutia Fuentes	(Switzerland) Riccardo Maiga (Finland) Timo Nieminen	(Switzerland) Alexander Sadecky (France) Davy Sum (Slovakia) Adrian Sikora (Russia) Alexey Vatutin
October 1	Kuwait F3 Futures; Meshref, Kuwait; Hard $10,000; Singles draw - Doubles draw	(Chinese Taipei) Chen Ti; 6–3, 6–1	(Kuwait) Abdullah Maqdas	(France) Laurent Malouli (India) Prajnesh Gunneswaran	(United Kingdom) Lewis Burton (South Africa) Ruan Roelofse (Switzerland) Jens Hauser (France) Romain Sichez
October 1	Kuwait F3 Futures; Meshref, Kuwait; Hard $10,000; Singles draw - Doubles draw	(United Kingdom) Lewis Burton (South Africa) Ruan Roelofse; 7–6^{(7–5)}, 7–6^{(7–2)}	(Kuwait) Mohammed Ghareeb (Russia) Mikhail Vasiliev	(France) Laurent Malouli (India) Prajnesh Gunneswaran	(United Kingdom) Lewis Burton (South Africa) Ruan Roelofse (Switzerland) Jens Hauser (France) Romain Sichez
October 1	Qatar F2 Futures; Doha, Qatar; Hard $10,000; Singles draw - Doubles draw	(France) Clément Reix; 6–3, 6–4	(United Kingdom) Oliver Golding	(Poland) Adam Chadaj (Slovakia) Marek Semjan	(Greece) Theodoros Angelinos (France) François-Arthur Vibert (Poland) Andriej Kapaś (United Kingdom) James Marsalek
October 1	Qatar F2 Futures; Doha, Qatar; Hard $10,000; Singles draw - Doubles draw	(Czech Republic) Roman Jebavý (Czech Republic) Otakar Lucák; 6–4, 6–4	(Poland) Adam Chadaj (Poland) Andriej Kapaś	(Poland) Adam Chadaj (Slovakia) Marek Semjan	(Greece) Theodoros Angelinos (France) François-Arthur Vibert (Poland) Andriej Kapaś (United Kingdom) James Marsalek
October 1	Spain F32 Futures; Sabadell, Spain; Clay $10,000; Singles draw - Doubles draw	(Spain) Roberto Carballés Baena; 6–4, 6–1	(Spain) Gerard Granollers-Pujol	(Spain) Arnau Brugués Davi (Spain) Gabriel Trujillo-Soler	(Venezuela) Ricardo Rodríguez (Spain) José Checa Calvo (France) Jonathan Eysseric (Italy) Daniele Giorgini
October 1	Spain F32 Futures; Sabadell, Spain; Clay $10,000; Singles draw - Doubles draw	(Spain) Jordi Marse-Vidri (Spain) Gabriel Trujillo-Soler; 6–2, 6–2	(Spain) Ricardo Ojeda Lara (Spain) Oriol Roca Batalla	(Spain) Arnau Brugués Davi (Spain) Gabriel Trujillo-Soler	(Venezuela) Ricardo Rodríguez (Spain) José Checa Calvo (France) Jonathan Eysseric (Italy) Daniele Giorgini
October 1	Sweden F7 Futures; Jönköping, Sweden; Hard $10,000; Singles draw - Doubles draw	(Sweden) Andreas Vinciguerra; 6–4, 7–6^{(7–3)}	(Canada) Érik Chvojka	(Sweden) Isak Arvidsson (Sweden) Robin Olin	(Sweden) Lucas Renard (Sweden) Ervin Eleskovic (Sweden) Fred Simonsson (Sweden) Patrik Brydolf
October 1	Sweden F7 Futures; Jönköping, Sweden; Hard $10,000; Singles draw - Doubles draw	(Sweden) Filip Bergevi (Sweden) Fred Simonsson; 6–2, 6–3	(Sweden) Kalle Averfalk (Sweden) Robin Olin	(Sweden) Isak Arvidsson (Sweden) Robin Olin	(Sweden) Lucas Renard (Sweden) Ervin Eleskovic (Sweden) Fred Simonsson (Sweden) Patrik Brydolf
October 1	Turkey F38 Futures; Antalya-Kaya Belek, Turkey; Hard $10,000; Singles draw - Doubles draw	(Switzerland) Stéphane Bohli; 7–6^{(7–3)}, 7–6^{(7–4)}	(Australia) Brydan Klein	(Russia) Mikhail Biryukov (Germany) Kevin Krawietz	(Austria) Maximilian Neuchrist (Austria) Tristan-Samuel Weissborn (Ukraine) Vadim Alekseenko (Italy) Edoardo Eremin
October 1	Turkey F38 Futures; Antalya-Kaya Belek, Turkey; Hard $10,000; Singles draw - Doubles draw	(Moldova) Maxim Dubarenco (Australia) Brydan Klein; 6–4, 3–6, [11–9]	(Italy) Edoardo Eremin (New Zealand) Artem Sitak	(Russia) Mikhail Biryukov (Germany) Kevin Krawietz	(Austria) Maximilian Neuchrist (Austria) Tristan-Samuel Weissborn (Ukraine) Vadim Alekseenko (Italy) Edoardo Eremin
October 8	Algeria F1 Futures; Annaba, Algeria; Clay $10,000; Singles draw - Doubles draw	(Canada) Steven Diez; 6–2, 6–3	(Austria) Gerald Melzer	(United Kingdom) Alexander Slabinsky (Bulgaria) Alexander Lazov	(Morocco) Hicham Khaddari (Serbia) Arsenije Zlatanović (Germany) Christian Plattes (Republic of Ireland) Sam Barry
October 8	Algeria F1 Futures; Annaba, Algeria; Clay $10,000; Singles draw - Doubles draw	(Austria) Lukas Jastraunig (Austria) Gerald Melzer; 6–2, 6–2	(Spain) Carlos Boluda-Purkiss (Bulgaria) Alexander Lazov	(United Kingdom) Alexander Slabinsky (Bulgaria) Alexander Lazov	(Morocco) Hicham Khaddari (Serbia) Arsenije Zlatanović (Germany) Christian Plattes (Republic of Ireland) Sam Barry
October 8	Australia F10 Futures; Margaret River, Australia; Hard $15,000; Singles draw - Doubles draw	(New Zealand) Michael Venus; 6–3, 3–6, 6–3	(Australia) Adam Feeney	(Australia) Benjamin Mitchell (Australia) Nick Kyrgios	(Australia) Matthew Barton (India) Saketh Myneni (Australia) Luke Saville (Australia) Jack Schipanski
October 8	Australia F10 Futures; Margaret River, Australia; Hard $15,000; Singles draw - Doubles draw	(Australia) Luke Saville (Australia) Andrew Whittington; 7–6^{(8–6)}, 7–6^{(7–4)}	(Australia) Matthew Barton (Australia) Michael Look	(Australia) Benjamin Mitchell (Australia) Nick Kyrgios	(Australia) Matthew Barton (India) Saketh Myneni (Australia) Luke Saville (Australia) Jack Schipanski
October 8	Bolivia F5 Futures; Santa Cruz, Bolivia; Clay $10,000; Singles draw - Doubles draw	(Argentina) Facundo Mena; 6–1, 6–2	(Argentina) Joaquín-Jesús Monteferrario	(Argentina) Federico Coria (Italy) Gianluigi Quinzi	(Colombia) Sebastián Serrano (Bolivia) Mauricio Doria-Medina (Argentina) Juan Pablo Ortiz (Peru) Mauricio Echazú
October 8	Bolivia F5 Futures; Santa Cruz, Bolivia; Clay $10,000; Singles draw - Doubles draw	(Peru) Mauricio Echazú (Peru) Sergio Galdós; 6–3, 6–3	(Bolivia) Hugo Dellien (Bolivia) Mauricio Doria-Medina	(Argentina) Federico Coria (Italy) Gianluigi Quinzi	(Colombia) Sebastián Serrano (Bolivia) Mauricio Doria-Medina (Argentina) Juan Pablo Ortiz (Peru) Mauricio Echazú
October 8	Chile F8 Futures; Coquimbo, Chile; Clay $10,000; Singles draw - Doubles draw	(Chile) Juan Carlos Sáez; 3–6, 6–2, 6–1	(Chile) Felipe Ríos	(Argentina) Nicolás Kicker (Chile) Guillermo Rivera Aránguiz	(Argentina) Gabriel Alejandro Hidalgo (Argentina) Mauricio Pérez Mota (Italy) Stefano Travaglia (Chile) Nicolás Gustavo Kauer
October 8	Chile F8 Futures; Coquimbo, Chile; Clay $10,000; Singles draw - Doubles draw	(Peru) Duilio Beretta (Argentina) Gustavo Sterin; 6–4, 7–5	(Chile) Guillermo Rivera Aránguiz (Chile) Cristóbal Saavedra-Corvalán	(Argentina) Nicolás Kicker (Chile) Guillermo Rivera Aránguiz	(Argentina) Gabriel Alejandro Hidalgo (Argentina) Mauricio Pérez Mota (Italy) Stefano Travaglia (Chile) Nicolás Gustavo Kauer
October 8	Croatia F10 Futures; Solin, Croatia; Clay $10,000; Singles draw - Doubles draw	(Slovakia) Andrej Martin; 6–2, 6–2	(Czech Republic) Jaroslav Pospíšil	(Czech Republic) Marek Michalička (Czech Republic) Dušan Lojda	(Italy) Matteo Fago (Serbia) Nikola Čačić (Croatia) Mate Delić (Croatia) Kristijan Mesaroš
October 8	Croatia F10 Futures; Solin, Croatia; Clay $10,000; Singles draw - Doubles draw	(Croatia) Mate Delić (Croatia) Tomislav Draganja; 6–3, 4–6, [11–9]	(Slovakia) Andrej Martin (Czech Republic) Jaroslav Pospíšil	(Czech Republic) Marek Michalička (Czech Republic) Dušan Lojda	(Italy) Matteo Fago (Serbia) Nikola Čačić (Croatia) Mate Delić (Croatia) Kristijan Mesaroš
October 8	France F20 Futures; Saint-Dizier, France; Hard $15,000; Singles draw - Doubles draw	(France) David Guez; 7–6^{(7–3)}, 6–7^{(6–8)}, 6–1	(Switzerland) Michael Lammer	(Latvia) Andis Juška (France) Alexandre Penaud	(Hungary) Márton Fucsovics (France) Grégoire Jacq (France) Mathieu Rodrigues (France) Mick Lescure
October 8	France F20 Futures; Saint-Dizier, France; Hard $15,000; Singles draw - Doubles draw	(France) Antoine Benneteau (France) Nicolas Renavand; 7–5, 6–4	(Republic of Ireland) James Cluskey (France) Alexandre Sidorenko	(Latvia) Andis Juška (France) Alexandre Penaud	(Hungary) Márton Fucsovics (France) Grégoire Jacq (France) Mathieu Rodrigues (France) Mick Lescure
October 8	Germany F19 Futures; Essen, Germany; Hard $10,000; Singles draw - Doubles draw	(Germany) Jan-Lennard Struff; 6–3, 6–2	(Germany) Bastian Knittel	(Finland) Timo Nieminen (Germany) Stefan Seifert	(Russia) Alexey Vatutin (Netherlands) Jesse Huta Galung (Slovakia) Adrian Sikora (United Kingdom) Alexander Ward
October 8	Germany F19 Futures; Essen, Germany; Hard $10,000; Singles draw - Doubles draw	(Netherlands) Romano Frantzen (United Kingdom) Alexander Ward; 3–6, 6–3, [10–6]	(Germany) Kevin Deden (Germany) Sascha Klör	(Finland) Timo Nieminen (Germany) Stefan Seifert	(Russia) Alexey Vatutin (Netherlands) Jesse Huta Galung (Slovakia) Adrian Sikora (United Kingdom) Alexander Ward
October 8	Japan F8 Futures; Kashiwa, Japan; Hard $15,000; Singles draw - Doubles draw	(Japan) Yūichi Sugita; 7–6^{(7–2)}, 6–2	(South Korea) Lim Yong-kyu	(Japan) Yasutaka Uchiyama (Japan) Gengo Kikuchi	(Japan) Takao Suzuki (Japan) Shota Tagawa (Japan) Sho Katayama (South Korea) Na Jung-woong
October 8	Japan F8 Futures; Kashiwa, Japan; Hard $15,000; Singles draw - Doubles draw	(Japan) Sho Katayama (Japan) Takao Suzuki; 3–6, 6–3, [10–8]	(New Zealand) Daniel King-Turner (New Zealand) Jose Statham	(Japan) Yasutaka Uchiyama (Japan) Gengo Kikuchi	(Japan) Takao Suzuki (Japan) Shota Tagawa (Japan) Sho Katayama (South Korea) Na Jung-woong
October 8	Qatar F3 Futures; Doha, Qatar; Hard $10,000; Singles draw - Doubles draw	(France) Clément Reix; 6–3, 6–2	(Poland) Adam Chadaj	(United Kingdom) Oliver Golding (Czech Republic) Otakar Lucák	(Poland) Andriej Kapaś (Czech Republic) Roman Jebavý (Greece) Theodoros Angelinos (France) Laurent Malouli
October 8	Qatar F3 Futures; Doha, Qatar; Hard $10,000; Singles draw - Doubles draw	(Poland) Adam Chadaj (Poland) Andriej Kapaś; 5–7, 6–4, [10–6]	(United Kingdom) Lewis Burton (Kuwait) Abdullah Maqdas	(United Kingdom) Oliver Golding (Czech Republic) Otakar Lucák	(Poland) Andriej Kapaś (Czech Republic) Roman Jebavý (Greece) Theodoros Angelinos (France) Laurent Malouli
October 8	Turkey F39 Futures; Antalya-Kaya Belek, Turkey; Hard $10,000; Singles draw - Doubles draw	(Bosnia and Herzegovina) Mirza Bašić; 6–4, 6–4	(Slovakia) Norbert Gombos	(Switzerland) Stéphane Bohli (Slovakia) Filip Horanský	(Italy) Riccardo Sinicropi (Croatia) Marin Bradarić (France) Jérôme Inzerillo (Germany) Dennis Blömke
October 8	Turkey F39 Futures; Antalya-Kaya Belek, Turkey; Hard $10,000; Singles draw - Doubles draw	(Czech Republic) Lubomír Majšajdr (Czech Republic) Ondřej Vaculík; 7–6^{(7–1)}, 6–4	(Slovakia) Filip Horanský (Slovakia) Filip Vittek	(Switzerland) Stéphane Bohli (Slovakia) Filip Horanský	(Italy) Riccardo Sinicropi (Croatia) Marin Bradarić (France) Jérôme Inzerillo (Germany) Dennis Blömke
October 8	USA F27 Futures; Austin, USA; Hard $15,000; Singles draw - Doubles draw	(United States) Austin Krajicek; 6–0, 6–1	(United Kingdom) Joshua Milton	(Australia) Carsten Ball (Mexico) Daniel Garza	(United States) Adam El Mihdawy (Uzbekistan) Rifat Biktyakov (United States) Devin Britton (United Kingdom) Daniel Smethurst
October 8	USA F27 Futures; Austin, USA; Hard $15,000; Singles draw - Doubles draw	(United States) Devin Britton (United States) Austin Krajicek; 6–4, 7–5	(Australia) Carsten Ball (United States) Chase Buchanan	(Australia) Carsten Ball (Mexico) Daniel Garza	(United States) Adam El Mihdawy (Uzbekistan) Rifat Biktyakov (United States) Devin Britton (United Kingdom) Daniel Smethurst
October 15	Algeria F2 Futures; Annaba, Algeria; Clay $10,000; Singles draw - Doubles draw	(Canada) Steven Diez; 4–6, 6–4, 6–1	(United Kingdom) Alexander Slabinsky	(Spain) Marc Giner (Serbia) Arsenije Zlatanović	(Republic of Ireland) Sam Barry (Spain) Roberto Ortega Olmedo (Bulgaria) Alexander Lazov (France) Romain Arneodo
October 15	Algeria F2 Futures; Annaba, Algeria; Clay $10,000; Singles draw - Doubles draw	(Canada) Steven Diez (Spain) Marc Giner; 6–4, 6–2	(Spain) Francesc Montañés-Roca (Russia) Ronald Slobodchikov	(Spain) Marc Giner (Serbia) Arsenije Zlatanović	(Republic of Ireland) Sam Barry (Spain) Roberto Ortega Olmedo (Bulgaria) Alexander Lazov (France) Romain Arneodo
October 15	Chile F9 Futures; Santiago, Chile; Clay $10,000; Singles draw - Doubles draw	(Italy) Stefano Travaglia; 6–3, 6–2	(Chile) Gonzalo Lama	(Italy) Gianluigi Quinzi (Argentina) Patricio Heras	(Argentina) Gabriel Alejandro Hidalgo (Switzerland) Joss Espasandin (Chile) Juan Carlos Sáez (Chile) Felipe Ríos
October 15	Chile F9 Futures; Santiago, Chile; Clay $10,000; Singles draw - Doubles draw	(Argentina) Gabriel Alejandro Hidalgo (Argentina) Mauricio Pérez Mota; 6–2, 6–1	(Argentina) Nicolás Kicker (Chile) Ignacio Lehyt	(Italy) Gianluigi Quinzi (Argentina) Patricio Heras	(Argentina) Gabriel Alejandro Hidalgo (Switzerland) Joss Espasandin (Chile) Juan Carlos Sáez (Chile) Felipe Ríos
October 15	Croatia F11 Futures; Dubrovnik, Croatia; Clay $15,000; Singles draw - Doubles draw	(Slovakia) Andrej Martin; 7–5, 3–6, 6–1	(Czech Republic) Dušan Lojda	(Croatia) Toni Androić (Italy) Marco Cecchinato	(Croatia) Joško Topić (Slovenia) Blaž Rola (Bosnia and Herzegovina) Aldin Šetkić (Czech Republic) Jaroslav Pospíšil
October 15	Croatia F11 Futures; Dubrovnik, Croatia; Clay $15,000; Singles draw - Doubles draw	(Croatia) Toni Androić (Croatia) Dino Marcan; 6–3, 6–3	(Serbia) Ivan Bjelica (Croatia) Matej Sabanov	(Croatia) Toni Androić (Italy) Marco Cecchinato	(Croatia) Joško Topić (Slovenia) Blaž Rola (Bosnia and Herzegovina) Aldin Šetkić (Czech Republic) Jaroslav Pospíšil
October 15	France F21 Futures; La Roche-sur-Yon, France; Hard $15,000+H; Singles draw - Doubles draw	(Belgium) Maxime Authom; 6–2, 3–6, 6–2	(France) Grégoire Burquier	(France) David Guez (France) Romain Jouan	(France) Antoine Benneteau (France) Jonathan Eysseric (France) Nicolas Renavand (Germany) Moritz Baumann
October 15	France F21 Futures; La Roche-sur-Yon, France; Hard $15,000+H; Singles draw - Doubles draw	(South Africa) Jean Andersen (France) Hugo Nys; 7–6^{(8–6)}, 7–6^{(7–3)}	(Germany) Moritz Baumann (Germany) Tim Pütz	(France) David Guez (France) Romain Jouan	(France) Antoine Benneteau (France) Jonathan Eysseric (France) Nicolas Renavand (Germany) Moritz Baumann
October 15	Germany F20 Futures; Bad Salzdetfurth, Germany; Carpet $10,000; Singles draw - Doubles draw	(Netherlands) Jesse Huta Galung; 6–4, 6–4	(Germany) Sami Reinwein	(Czech Republic) Jan Šátral (Belarus) Nikolai Fidirko	(Czech Republic) Jan Blecha (Germany) Bastian Wagner (Germany) Tom Schönenberg (Germany) Maximilian Marterer
October 15	Germany F20 Futures; Bad Salzdetfurth, Germany; Carpet $10,000; Singles draw - Doubles draw	(United States) Adham El-Effendi (United Kingdom) Darren Walsh; 7–6^{(7–3)}, 6–3	(Germany) Tim Beutler (Germany) Lennart Zynga	(Czech Republic) Jan Šátral (Belarus) Nikolai Fidirko	(Czech Republic) Jan Blecha (Germany) Bastian Wagner (Germany) Tom Schönenberg (Germany) Maximilian Marterer
October 15	Great Britain F17 Futures; Glasgow, Great Britain; Hard $15,000; Singles draw - Doubles draw	(Germany) Bastian Knittel; 6–2, 6–4	(United Kingdom) Ashley Hewitt	(United Kingdom) Neil Pauffley (United Kingdom) Richard Bloomfield	(United Kingdom) Josh Goodall (United Kingdom) Daniel Evans (United Kingdom) Alexander Ward (United Kingdom) Jamie Baker
October 15	Great Britain F17 Futures; Glasgow, Great Britain; Hard $15,000; Singles draw - Doubles draw	(United Kingdom) David Rice (United Kingdom) Sean Thornley; 6–3, 6–2	(Lithuania) Laurynas Grigelis (Germany) Bastian Knittel	(United Kingdom) Neil Pauffley (United Kingdom) Richard Bloomfield	(United Kingdom) Josh Goodall (United Kingdom) Daniel Evans (United Kingdom) Alexander Ward (United Kingdom) Jamie Baker
October 15	Israel F10 Futures; Akko, Israel; Hard $10,000; Singles draw - Doubles draw	(France) Pierre-Hugues Herbert; 6–4, 6–2	(Slovakia) Adrian Sikora	(France) Axel Michon (Czech Republic) Michal Schmid	(Israel) Amir Weintraub (Netherlands) Kevin Griekspoor (United States) Kirill Kasyanov (Netherlands) Wesley Koolhof
October 15	Israel F10 Futures; Akko, Israel; Hard $10,000; Singles draw - Doubles draw	(France) Pierre-Hugues Herbert (Finland) Henrik Sillanpää; 6–4, 6–3	(Netherlands) Stephan Fransen (Netherlands) Wesley Koolhof	(France) Axel Michon (Czech Republic) Michal Schmid	(Israel) Amir Weintraub (Netherlands) Kevin Griekspoor (United States) Kirill Kasyanov (Netherlands) Wesley Koolhof
October 15	Japan F9 Futures; Ōarai, Japan; Hard $15,000; Singles draw - Doubles draw	(Japan) Sho Katayama; 7–6^{(7–4)}, 6–3	(Japan) Hiroki Kondo	(Japan) Shota Tagawa (Japan) Shuichi Sekiguchi	(Japan) Bumpei Sato (Japan) Masato Shiga (Japan) Hiroyasu Ehara (South Korea) Na Jung-woong
October 15	Japan F9 Futures; Ōarai, Japan; Hard $15,000; Singles draw - Doubles draw	(South Korea) An Jae-sung (Japan) Arata Onozawa; 2–6, 6–1, [10–6]	(Japan) Toshihide Matsui (Chinese Taipei) Yi Chu-huan	(Japan) Shota Tagawa (Japan) Shuichi Sekiguchi	(Japan) Bumpei Sato (Japan) Masato Shiga (Japan) Hiroyasu Ehara (South Korea) Na Jung-woong
October 15	Kazakhstan F8 Futures; Almaty, Kazakhstan; Hard $15,000; Singles draw - Doubles draw	(Poland) Marcin Gawron; 7–5, 6–4	(Ukraine) Denys Molchanov	(Belgium) Germain Gigounon (Russia) Victor Baluda	(Estonia) Vladimir Ivanov (Belgium) Yannik Reuter (Poland) Piotr Gadomski (Poland) Grzegorz Panfil
October 15	Kazakhstan F8 Futures; Almaty, Kazakhstan; Hard $15,000; Singles draw - Doubles draw	(Germany) Jaan-Frederik Brunken (Ukraine) Denys Molchanov; 3–6, 6–0, [10–7]	(Poland) Marcin Gawron (Poland) Andriej Kapaś	(Belgium) Germain Gigounon (Russia) Victor Baluda	(Estonia) Vladimir Ivanov (Belgium) Yannik Reuter (Poland) Piotr Gadomski (Poland) Grzegorz Panfil
October 15	Morocco F6 Futures; Casablanca, Morocco; Clay $15,000; Singles draw - Doubles draw	(Romania) Victor Crivoi; 6–3, 1–6, 6–4	(Algeria) Lamine Ouahab	(Czech Republic) Jiří Veselý (Australia) Jason Kubler	(Spain) Jordi Samper-Montaña (Germany) Marc Sieber (Germany) Steven Moneke (Italy) Andrea Arnaboldi
October 15	Morocco F6 Futures; Casablanca, Morocco; Clay $15,000; Singles draw - Doubles draw	(Romania) Victor Crivoi (Algeria) Lamine Ouahab; 6–1, 3–6, [10–6]	(Germany) Steven Moneke (Germany) Marc Sieber	(Czech Republic) Jiří Veselý (Australia) Jason Kubler	(Spain) Jordi Samper-Montaña (Germany) Marc Sieber (Germany) Steven Moneke (Italy) Andrea Arnaboldi
October 15	Nigeria F1 Futures; Lagos, Nigeria; Hard $15,000+H; Singles draw - Doubles draw	(Spain) Enrique López-Pérez; 7–5, 1–6, 6–4	(Egypt) Sherif Sabry	(Egypt) Karim-Mohamed Maamoun (Japan) Kento Takeuchi	(Slovakia) Kamil Čapkovič (Italy) Alessandro Bega (Italy) Alessandro Petrone (South Africa) Ruan Roelofse
October 15	Nigeria F1 Futures; Lagos, Nigeria; Hard $15,000+H; Singles draw - Doubles draw	(Slovakia) Kamil Čapkovič (South Africa) Ruan Roelofse; 6–4, 6–2	(Italy) Alessandro Bega (Spain) Enrique López-Pérez	(Egypt) Karim-Mohamed Maamoun (Japan) Kento Takeuchi	(Slovakia) Kamil Čapkovič (Italy) Alessandro Bega (Italy) Alessandro Petrone (South Africa) Ruan Roelofse
October 15	Qatar F4 Futures; Doha, Qatar; Hard $10,000; Singles draw - Doubles draw	(Greece) Theodoros Angelinos; 7–5, 7–5	(Czech Republic) Roman Jebavý	(Czech Republic) Otakar Lucák (Slovakia) Marek Semjan	(Slovakia) Marko Daniš (United Kingdom) Oliver Golding (United Kingdom) James Marsalek (Germany) Alexander Zverev
October 15	Qatar F4 Futures; Doha, Qatar; Hard $10,000; Singles draw - Doubles draw	(Slovakia) Marko Daniš (Slovakia) Marek Semjan; 7–5, 7–6^{(7–2)}	(Monaco) Benjamin Balleret (Kuwait) Mohammed Ghareeb	(Czech Republic) Otakar Lucák (Slovakia) Marek Semjan	(Slovakia) Marko Daniš (United Kingdom) Oliver Golding (United Kingdom) James Marsalek (Germany) Alexander Zverev
October 15	Turkey F40 Futures; Adana, Turkey; Hard $10,000; Singles draw - Doubles draw	(Croatia) Marin Bradarić; 7–5, 3–0 Ret.	(Belgium) Alexandre Folie	(Egypt) Mohamed Safwat (Bosnia and Herzegovina) Mirza Bašić	(Czech Republic) Michal Konečný (Moldova) Andrei Ciumac (France) Jules Marie (France) Jérôme Inzerillo
October 15	Turkey F40 Futures; Adana, Turkey; Hard $10,000; Singles draw - Doubles draw	(United Kingdom) Jack Carpenter (United Kingdom) George Morgan; 6–3, 6–4	(Moldova) Andrei Ciumac (Egypt) Mohamed Safwat	(Egypt) Mohamed Safwat (Bosnia and Herzegovina) Mirza Bašić	(Czech Republic) Michal Konečný (Moldova) Andrei Ciumac (France) Jules Marie (France) Jérôme Inzerillo
October 15	USA F28 Futures; Mansfield, USA; Hard $15,000; Singles draw - Doubles draw	(Germany) Mischa Zverev; 3–6, 6–0, 6–3	(United States) Alex Kuznetsov	(Japan) Taro Daniel (United States) Austin Krajicek	(United Kingdom) Joshua Milton (Tunisia) Mohamed Abid (United States) Tennys Sandgren (Australia) Chris Guccione
October 15	USA F28 Futures; Mansfield, USA; Hard $15,000; Singles draw - Doubles draw	(United States) Vahid Mirzadeh (United States) Ryan Rowe; 6–2, 6–7^{(5–7)}, [10–7]	(United States) Alex Kuznetsov (Germany) Mischa Zverev	(Japan) Taro Daniel (United States) Austin Krajicek	(United Kingdom) Joshua Milton (Tunisia) Mohamed Abid (United States) Tennys Sandgren (Australia) Chris Guccione
October 22	Algeria F3 Futures; Alger, Algeria; Clay $10,000; Singles draw - Doubles draw	(Canada) Steven Diez; 6–1, 4–6, 6–2	(Italy) Francesco Picco	(Bulgaria) Alexander Lazov (Spain) Marc Giner	(Portugal) Gonçalo Loureiro (Spain) José Antón Salazar Martín (Netherlands) Mark Vervoort (Morocco) Younès Rachidi
October 22	Algeria F3 Futures; Alger, Algeria; Clay $10,000; Singles draw - Doubles draw	(Spain) Marc Giner (Netherlands) Mark Vervoort; 6–3, 6–4	(Italy) Kevin Albonetti (Netherlands) Jan-Wouter Roep	(Bulgaria) Alexander Lazov (Spain) Marc Giner	(Portugal) Gonçalo Loureiro (Spain) José Antón Salazar Martín (Netherlands) Mark Vervoort (Morocco) Younès Rachidi
October 22	Australia F11 Futures; Traralgon, Australia; Hard $15,000; Singles draw - Doubles draw	(Australia) Benjamin Mitchell; 6–3, 2–6, 6–1	(Australia) Luke Saville	(Australia) John Millman (Australia) Matt Reid	(Australia) Jack Schipanski (United States) Sean Berman (New Zealand) Jose Statham (New Zealand) Michael Venus
October 22	Australia F11 Futures; Traralgon, Australia; Hard $15,000; Singles draw - Doubles draw	(New Zealand) Jose Statham (New Zealand) Michael Venus; 3–6, 6–3, [11–9]	(Australia) Matthew Barton (Australia) Michael Look	(Australia) John Millman (Australia) Matt Reid	(Australia) Jack Schipanski (United States) Sean Berman (New Zealand) Jose Statham (New Zealand) Michael Venus
October 22	Brazil F31 Futures; Santa Maria, Brazil; Clay $10,000; Singles draw - Doubles draw	(Brazil) André Miele; 2–6, 6–1, 6–3	(Argentina) Joaquín-Jesús Monteferrario	(Italy) Gianluigi Quinzi (Brazil) Augusto Laranja	(Brazil) Bruno Sant'Anna (Brazil) Wilson Leite (Italy) Giammarco Micolani (Brazil) Caio Silva
October 22	Brazil F31 Futures; Santa Maria, Brazil; Clay $10,000; Singles draw - Doubles draw	(Brazil) Daniel Dutra da Silva (Brazil) Caio Silva; 6–2, 6–7^{(5–7)}, [10–7]	(Brazil) André Miele (Brazil) Alexandre Tsuchiya	(Italy) Gianluigi Quinzi (Brazil) Augusto Laranja	(Brazil) Bruno Sant'Anna (Brazil) Wilson Leite (Italy) Giammarco Micolani (Brazil) Caio Silva
October 22	Chile F10 Futures; Villa Alemana, Chile; Clay $10,000; Singles draw - Doubles draw	(Argentina) Patricio Heras; 2–6, 6–4, 6–4	(Italy) Stefano Travaglia	(Argentina) Mauricio Pérez Mota (Argentina) Nicolás Kicker	(Argentina) Gabriel Alejandro Hidalgo (Chile) Jorge Montero (Chile) David Fleming (Chile) Christian Garín
October 22	Chile F10 Futures; Villa Alemana, Chile; Clay $10,000; Singles draw - Doubles draw	(United States) Nicolás Jarry (Chile) Gonzalo Lama; 5–7, 6–3, [10–4]	(Argentina) Gabriel Alejandro Hidalgo (Argentina) Mauricio Pérez Mota	(Argentina) Mauricio Pérez Mota (Argentina) Nicolás Kicker	(Argentina) Gabriel Alejandro Hidalgo (Chile) Jorge Montero (Chile) David Fleming (Chile) Christian Garín
October 22	Croatia F12 Futures; Dubrovnik, Croatia; Clay $15,000; Singles draw - Doubles draw	(Czech Republic) Dušan Lojda; 6–2, 6–3	(Czech Republic) Jaroslav Pospíšil	(Slovenia) Blaž Rola (Bosnia and Herzegovina) Aldin Šetkić	(Czech Republic) Marek Michalička (Croatia) Dino Marcan (Italy) Matteo Marrai (Ukraine) Denys Mylokostov
October 22	Croatia F12 Futures; Dubrovnik, Croatia; Clay $15,000; Singles draw - Doubles draw	(Croatia) Toni Androić (Croatia) Dino Marcan; 7–5, 6–1	(Croatia) Tomislav Draganja (Serbia) Ilija Vučić	(Slovenia) Blaž Rola (Bosnia and Herzegovina) Aldin Šetkić	(Czech Republic) Marek Michalička (Croatia) Dino Marcan (Italy) Matteo Marrai (Ukraine) Denys Mylokostov
October 22	France F22 Futures; Rodez, France; Hard $15,000+H; Singles draw - Doubles draw	(France) Fabrice Martin; 6–3, 6–2	(Belgium) Maxime Authom	(France) David Guez (Spain) Adrián Menéndez Maceiras	(France) Jonathan Eysseric (France) Marc Gicquel (Germany) Nils Langer (Italy) Riccardo Ghedin
October 22	France F22 Futures; Rodez, France; Hard $15,000+H; Singles draw - Doubles draw	(United States) Adham El-Effendi (United Kingdom) Darren Walsh; 7–6^{(7–5)}, 6–4	(Belgium) Maxime Authom (France) Romain Jouan	(France) David Guez (Spain) Adrián Menéndez Maceiras	(France) Jonathan Eysseric (France) Marc Gicquel (Germany) Nils Langer (Italy) Riccardo Ghedin
October 22	Great Britain F18 Futures; Cardiff, Great Britain; Hard $15,000; Singles draw - Doubles draw	(Germany) Bastian Knittel; 6–1, 6–2	(Germany) Tim Pütz	(Spain) Arnau Brugués Davi (United Kingdom) Jamie Baker	(Germany) Kevin Krawietz (United Kingdom) Neil Pauffley (United Kingdom) Tom Farquharson (Belgium) Yannick Mertens
October 22	Great Britain F18 Futures; Cardiff, Great Britain; Hard $15,000; Singles draw - Doubles draw	(Germany) Bastian Knittel (Germany) Kevin Krawietz; 3–6, 6–4, [10–7]	(Lithuania) Laurynas Grigelis (Italy) Giuseppe Menga	(Spain) Arnau Brugués Davi (United Kingdom) Jamie Baker	(Germany) Kevin Krawietz (United Kingdom) Neil Pauffley (United Kingdom) Tom Farquharson (Belgium) Yannick Mertens
October 22	Greece F4 Futures; Heraklion, Greece; Hard $10,000; Singles draw - Doubles draw	(Germany) Robin Kern; 6–1, 7–6^{(7–5)}	(Switzerland) Alexander Sadecky	(Canada) Milan Pokrajac (Italy) Edoardo Eremin	(Greece) Theodoros Angelinos (Italy) Viktor Galović (Czech Republic) Michal Schmid (Belgium) Julien Dubail
October 22	Greece F4 Futures; Heraklion, Greece; Hard $10,000; Singles draw - Doubles draw	(Canada) Milan Pokrajac (Switzerland) Alexander Sadecky; 6–2, 6–4	(Germany) Robin Kern (Germany) Sebastian Wagner	(Canada) Milan Pokrajac (Italy) Edoardo Eremin	(Greece) Theodoros Angelinos (Italy) Viktor Galović (Czech Republic) Michal Schmid (Belgium) Julien Dubail
October 22	India F13 Futures; Mumbai, India; Hard $15,000; Singles draw - Doubles draw	(India) Jeevan Nedunchezhiyan; 6–1, 6–1	(Croatia) Mate Pavić	(Chinese Taipei) Huang Liang-chi (India) Purav Raja	(India) Ranjeet Virali-Murugesan (Austria) Nicolas Reissig (United Kingdom) James Marsalek (Indonesia) Christopher Rungkat
October 22	India F13 Futures; Mumbai, India; Hard $15,000; Singles draw - Doubles draw	(India) Saketh Myneni (India) Purav Raja; 6–0, 4–6, [10–8]	(India) Sriram Balaji (India) Arun-Prakash Rajagopalan	(Chinese Taipei) Huang Liang-chi (India) Purav Raja	(India) Ranjeet Virali-Murugesan (Austria) Nicolas Reissig (United Kingdom) James Marsalek (Indonesia) Christopher Rungkat
October 22	Israel F11 Futures; Ashkelon, Israel; Hard $10,000; Singles draw - Doubles draw	(Netherlands) Wesley Koolhof; 6–1, 6–2	(Austria) Maximilian Neuchrist	(France) Pierre-Hugues Herbert (Netherlands) Kevin Griekspoor	(United Kingdom) Richard Gabb (Slovakia) Adrian Sikora (United Kingdom) Oliver Golding (Slovakia) Juraj Masár
October 22	Israel F11 Futures; Ashkelon, Israel; Hard $10,000; Singles draw - Doubles draw	(Netherlands) Stephan Fransen (Netherlands) Wesley Koolhof; 6–4, 6–4	(France) Pierre-Hugues Herbert (France) Davy Sum	(France) Pierre-Hugues Herbert (Netherlands) Kevin Griekspoor	(United Kingdom) Richard Gabb (Slovakia) Adrian Sikora (United Kingdom) Oliver Golding (Slovakia) Juraj Masár
October 22	Kazakhstan F9 Futures; Astana, Kazakhstan; Hard $15,000; Singles draw - Doubles draw	(Ukraine) Denys Molchanov; 6–4, 6–4	(Russia) Alexander Rumyantsev	(Russia) Andrey Kumantsov (Poland) Marcin Gawron	(Belgium) Yannik Reuter (Russia) Victor Baluda (Uzbekistan) Sarvar Ikramov (Belgium) Germain Gigounon
October 22	Kazakhstan F9 Futures; Astana, Kazakhstan; Hard $15,000; Singles draw - Doubles draw	(Russia) Victor Baluda (Russia) Sergei Krotiouk; 6–7^{(7–9)}, 6–4, [10–7]	(Belgium) Julien Cagnina (Russia) Mikhail Vaks	(Russia) Andrey Kumantsov (Poland) Marcin Gawron	(Belgium) Yannik Reuter (Russia) Victor Baluda (Uzbekistan) Sarvar Ikramov (Belgium) Germain Gigounon
October 22	Morocco F7 Futures; Casablanca, Morocco; Clay $15,000; Singles draw - Doubles draw	(Romania) Victor Crivoi; 6–0, 6–3	(Algeria) Lamine Ouahab	(Germany) Marc Sieber (Germany) Steven Moneke	(Italy) Luca Vanni (Spain) Pablo Carreño Busta (Spain) Eduard Esteve Lobato (Spain) Roberto Carballés Baena
October 22	Morocco F7 Futures; Casablanca, Morocco; Clay $15,000; Singles draw - Doubles draw	(Germany) Steven Moneke (Germany) Marc Sieber; 6–4, 6–0	(Italy) Daniele Capecchi (Italy) Manuel Mazzella	(Germany) Marc Sieber (Germany) Steven Moneke	(Italy) Luca Vanni (Spain) Pablo Carreño Busta (Spain) Eduard Esteve Lobato (Spain) Roberto Carballés Baena
October 22	Nigeria F2 Futures; Lagos, Nigeria; Hard $15,000+H; Singles draw - Doubles draw	(Spain) Enrique López-Pérez; 6–0, 6–4	(South Africa) Ruan Roelofse	(Japan) Kento Takeuchi (Italy) Alessandro Bega	(Slovakia) Kamil Čapkovič (Italy) Alessandro Petrone (Egypt) Karim-Mohamed Maamoun (Egypt) Sherif Sabry
October 22	Nigeria F2 Futures; Lagos, Nigeria; Hard $15,000+H; Singles draw - Doubles draw	(Slovakia) Kamil Čapkovič (South Africa) Ruan Roelofse; 6–1, 6–2	(Italy) Alessandro Bega (Spain) Enrique López-Pérez	(Japan) Kento Takeuchi (Italy) Alessandro Bega	(Slovakia) Kamil Čapkovič (Italy) Alessandro Petrone (Egypt) Karim-Mohamed Maamoun (Egypt) Sherif Sabry
October 22	Turkey F41 Futures; Antalya-Kaya Belek, Turkey; Hard $10,000; Singles draw - Doubles draw	(Netherlands) Jesse Huta Galung; 6–3, 6–3	(Kazakhstan) Evgeny Korolev	(Bosnia and Herzegovina) Mirza Bašić (Turkey) Marsel İlhan	(Slovakia) Norbert Gombos (France) Jérôme Inzerillo (Czech Republic) Michal Konečný (Sweden) Isak Arvidsson
October 22	Turkey F41 Futures; Antalya-Kaya Belek, Turkey; Hard $10,000; Singles draw - Doubles draw	(France) Maxime Forcin (France) Yannick Thivant; 6–3, 7–6^{(7–5)}	(Romania) Sebastian Kraila (Romania) Gabriel Moraru	(Bosnia and Herzegovina) Mirza Bašić (Turkey) Marsel İlhan	(Slovakia) Norbert Gombos (France) Jérôme Inzerillo (Czech Republic) Michal Konečný (Sweden) Isak Arvidsson
October 22	USA F29 Futures; Birmingham, USA; Clay $10,000; Singles draw - Doubles draw	(United Kingdom) Kyle Edmund; 7–6^{(7–2)}, 2–6, 6–4	(United States) Chase Buchanan	(Mexico) Daniel Garza (United States) Mitchell Krueger	(United States) Dennis Nevolo (France) Lucas Pouille (Japan) Yoshihito Nishioka (United Kingdom) Luke Bambridge
October 22	USA F29 Futures; Birmingham, USA; Clay $10,000; Singles draw - Doubles draw	(United States) Bjorn Fratangelo (United States) Mitchell Krueger; 6–2, 6–3	(United States) Chase Buchanan (United States) Vahid Mirzadeh	(Mexico) Daniel Garza (United States) Mitchell Krueger	(United States) Dennis Nevolo (France) Lucas Pouille (Japan) Yoshihito Nishioka (United Kingdom) Luke Bambridge
October 22	Venezuela F4 Futures; Caracas, Venezuela; Hard $15,000; Singles draw - Doubles draw	(Venezuela) Ricardo Rodríguez; 6–4, 5–7, 6–4	(Venezuela) David Souto	(Venezuela) Roberto Maytín (France) Simon Cauvard	(United States) Jared Donaldson (Venezuela) Piero Luisi (Venezuela) Luis David Martínez (Italy) Stefano Napolitano
October 22	Venezuela F4 Futures; Caracas, Venezuela; Hard $15,000; Singles draw - Doubles draw	(Italy) Enrico Fioravante (Italy) Claudio Grassi; 3–6, 7–5, [10–3]	(El Salvador) Marcelo Arévalo (Venezuela) Piero Luisi	(Venezuela) Roberto Maytín (France) Simon Cauvard	(United States) Jared Donaldson (Venezuela) Piero Luisi (Venezuela) Luis David Martínez (Italy) Stefano Napolitano
October 29	Australia F12 Futures; Bendigo, Australia; Hard $15,000; Singles draw - Doubles draw	(Australia) John Millman; 6–3, 6–3	(Australia) Benjamin Mitchell	(Australia) Adam Feeney (Australia) Thanasi Kokkinakis	(Australia) Luke Saville (Australia) Michael Look (New Zealand) Michael Venus (Australia) Nick Kyrgios
October 29	Australia F12 Futures; Bendigo, Australia; Hard $15,000; Singles draw - Doubles draw	(Australia) Adam Feeney (Australia) Matt Reid; 6–1, 3–6, [14–12]	(Australia) Matthew Barton (Australia) Michael Look	(Australia) Adam Feeney (Australia) Thanasi Kokkinakis	(Australia) Luke Saville (Australia) Michael Look (New Zealand) Michael Venus (Australia) Nick Kyrgios
October 29	Brazil F32 Futures; Porto Alegre, Brazil; Clay $10,000; Singles draw - Doubles draw	(Brazil) Pedro Zerbini; 6–3, 6–2	(Brazil) Thiago Monteiro	(Chile) Hans Podlipnik-Castillo (Brazil) Bruno Sant'Anna	(Brazil) Eduardo Dischinger (Brazil) Diego Matos (Italy) Giammarco Micolani (Brazil) João Pedro Sorgi
October 29	Brazil F32 Futures; Porto Alegre, Brazil; Clay $10,000; Singles draw - Doubles draw	(Brazil) Fabrício Neis (Brazil) Thales Turini; 6–4, 7–6^{(7–4)}	(Brazil) André Miele (Brazil) Caio Zampieri	(Chile) Hans Podlipnik-Castillo (Brazil) Bruno Sant'Anna	(Brazil) Eduardo Dischinger (Brazil) Diego Matos (Italy) Giammarco Micolani (Brazil) João Pedro Sorgi
October 29	Chile F11 Futures; Santiago, Chile; Clay $10,000; Singles draw - Doubles draw	(Chile) Guillermo Rivera Aránguiz; 7–6^{(7–3)}, 6–0	(Brazil) Gustavo Guerses	(Chile) Jorge Montero (Chile) Christian Garín	(Argentina) Gabriel Alejandro Hidalgo (Chile) Nicolás Gustavo Kauer (Argentina) Franco Agamenone (Argentina) Mauricio Pérez Mota
October 29	Chile F11 Futures; Santiago, Chile; Clay $10,000; Singles draw - Doubles draw	(Chile) Gonzalo Lama (Chile) Benjamin Ugarte; 7–6^{(7–5)}, 6–7^{(4–7)}, [10–4]	(Argentina) Patricio Heras (Argentina) Gaston Paz	(Chile) Jorge Montero (Chile) Christian Garín	(Argentina) Gabriel Alejandro Hidalgo (Chile) Nicolás Gustavo Kauer (Argentina) Franco Agamenone (Argentina) Mauricio Pérez Mota
October 29	Czech Republic F7 Futures; Rožnov pod Radhoštěm, Czech Republic; Carpet $10,000; Singles draw - Doubles draw	(Czech Republic) Roman Jebavý; 6–2, 6–4	(Czech Republic) Jan Šátral	(Belarus) Alexander Bury (Czech Republic) Adam Pavlásek	(Czech Republic) Dominik Süč (Slovakia) Juraj Masár (Czech Republic) Lubomír Majšajdr (United Kingdom) Neil Pauffley
October 29	Czech Republic F7 Futures; Rožnov pod Radhoštěm, Czech Republic; Carpet $10,000; Singles draw - Doubles draw	(Czech Republic) Roman Jebavý (Czech Republic) Jan Šátral; 6–7^{(5–7)}, 6–1, [10–5]	(Belarus) Alexander Bury (Belarus) Nikolai Fidirko	(Belarus) Alexander Bury (Czech Republic) Adam Pavlásek	(Czech Republic) Dominik Süč (Slovakia) Juraj Masár (Czech Republic) Lubomír Majšajdr (United Kingdom) Neil Pauffley
October 29	Greece F5 Futures; Heraklion, Greece; Carpet $10,000; Singles draw - Doubles draw	(Italy) Viktor Galović; 2–6, 7–6^{(7–4)}, 7–5	(Germany) Robin Kern	(France) Yannick Jankovits (Belgium) Julien Dubail	(Slovenia) Tom Kočevar-Dešman (Serbia) Miki Janković (Germany) Richard Waite (Italy) Edoardo Eremin
October 29	Greece F5 Futures; Heraklion, Greece; Carpet $10,000; Singles draw - Doubles draw	(Greece) Alexandros Jakupovic (France) Yannick Jankovits; 6–7^{(6–8)}, 6–4, [10–8]	(Sweden) Patrick Brydolf (Russia) Mikhail Vasiliev	(France) Yannick Jankovits (Belgium) Julien Dubail	(Slovenia) Tom Kočevar-Dešman (Serbia) Miki Janković (Germany) Richard Waite (Italy) Edoardo Eremin
October 29	India F14 Futures; Pune, India; Hard $15,000; Singles draw - Doubles draw	(India) Prakash Amritraj; 6–4, 6–2	(India) Saketh Myneni	(Indonesia) Christopher Rungkat (Austria) Nicolas Reissig	(Croatia) Mate Pavić (India) Jeevan Nedunchezhiyan (Chinese Taipei) Huang Liang-chi (India) Sriram Balaji
October 29	India F14 Futures; Pune, India; Hard $15,000; Singles draw - Doubles draw	(India) Saketh Myneni (India) Purav Raja; 7–5, 6–7^{(3–7)}, [10–5]	(India) Sriram Balaji (India) Arun-Prakash Rajagopalan	(Indonesia) Christopher Rungkat (Austria) Nicolas Reissig	(Croatia) Mate Pavić (India) Jeevan Nedunchezhiyan (Chinese Taipei) Huang Liang-chi (India) Sriram Balaji
October 29	Israel F12 Futures; Netanya, Israel; Hard $10,000; Singles draw - Doubles draw	(Austria) Maximilian Neuchrist; 6–4, 6–4	(France) Axel Michon	(United States) Michael Laser (France) Davy Sum	(United Kingdom) Richard Gabb (Israel) Tal Eros (Netherlands) Wesley Koolhof (Israel) Or Rem-Harel
October 29	Israel F12 Futures; Netanya, Israel; Hard $10,000; Singles draw - Doubles draw	(Netherlands) Stephan Fransen (Netherlands) Wesley Koolhof; 4–6, 7–6^{(7–4)}, [11–9]	(Republic of Ireland) Sam Barry (New Zealand) Sebastian Lavie	(United States) Michael Laser (France) Davy Sum	(United Kingdom) Richard Gabb (Israel) Tal Eros (Netherlands) Wesley Koolhof (Israel) Or Rem-Harel
October 29	Mexico F12 Futures; Cancún, Mexico; Hard $10,000; Singles draw - Doubles draw	(Australia) Matheson Klein; 4–6, 6–4, 6–4	(United States) Chris Wettengel	(Dominican Republic) José Hernández (Canada) Filip Peliwo	(Ukraine) Vladislav Bondarenko (Brazil) Guilherme Hadlich (Haiti) Olivier Sajous (Italy) Roberto Marcora
October 29	Mexico F12 Futures; Cancún, Mexico; Hard $10,000; Singles draw - Doubles draw	(New Zealand) Marvin Barker (Guatemala) Christopher Díaz Figueroa; 6–4, 6–1	(Switzerland) Riccardo Maiga (Italy) Roberto Marcora	(Dominican Republic) José Hernández (Canada) Filip Peliwo	(Ukraine) Vladislav Bondarenko (Brazil) Guilherme Hadlich (Haiti) Olivier Sajous (Italy) Roberto Marcora
October 29	Thailand F4 Futures; Phuket, Thailand; Hard $10,000; Singles draw - Doubles draw	(Netherlands) Miliaan Niesten; 3–6, 6–3, 6–4	(Netherlands) Matwe Middelkoop	(United Kingdom) Lewis Burton (United Kingdom) Alexander Ward	(Australia) Brydan Klein (Australia) Ryan Agar (Thailand) Kittiphong Wachiramanowong (Australia) Dane Propoggia
October 29	Thailand F4 Futures; Phuket, Thailand; Hard $10,000; Singles draw - Doubles draw	(Netherlands) Matwe Middelkoop (Netherlands) Miliaan Niesten; 6–3, 6–0	(Algeria) Mehdsi Bouras (France) Mick Lescure	(United Kingdom) Lewis Burton (United Kingdom) Alexander Ward	(Australia) Brydan Klein (Australia) Ryan Agar (Thailand) Kittiphong Wachiramanowong (Australia) Dane Propoggia
October 29	Turkey F42 Futures; Antalya-Kaya Belek, Turkey; Hard $10,000; Singles draw - Doubles draw	(Turkey) Marsel İlhan; 7–6^{(10–8)}, 6–2	(Ukraine) Volodymyr Uzhylovskyi	(France) Jules Marie (Bulgaria) Dimitar Kuzmanov	(Netherlands) Jesse Huta Galung (Russia) Mikhail Biryukov (Belgium) Joris De Loore (Moldova) Maxim Dubarenco
October 29	Turkey F42 Futures; Antalya-Kaya Belek, Turkey; Hard $10,000; Singles draw - Doubles draw	(Ukraine) Artem Smirnov (Ukraine) Volodymyr Uzhylovskyi; 6–1, 7–6^{(7–3)}	(Moldova) Maxim Dubarenco (Ukraine) Vladyslav Manafov	(France) Jules Marie (Bulgaria) Dimitar Kuzmanov	(Netherlands) Jesse Huta Galung (Russia) Mikhail Biryukov (Belgium) Joris De Loore (Moldova) Maxim Dubarenco
October 29	USA F30 Futures; Pensacola, USA; Clay $10,000; Singles draw - Doubles draw	(France) Florian Reynet; 6–0, 6–0	(United States) Sekou Bangoura	(United Kingdom) Liam Broady (United States) Noah Rubin	(Germany) Pirmin Hänle (United Kingdom) Kyle Edmund (Russia) Artem Ilyushin (United States) Dennis Nevolo
October 29	USA F30 Futures; Pensacola, USA; Clay $10,000; Singles draw - Doubles draw	(United States) Chase Buchanan (United States) Daniel Nguyen; 3–6, 6–4, [10–7]	(Monaco) Benjamin Balleret (Germany) Peter Heller	(United Kingdom) Liam Broady (United States) Noah Rubin	(Germany) Pirmin Hänle (United Kingdom) Kyle Edmund (Russia) Artem Ilyushin (United States) Dennis Nevolo
October 29	Venezuela F5 Futures; Maracaibo, Venezuela; Hard $15,000; Singles draw - Doubles draw	(Venezuela) David Souto; 2–6, 6–4, 6–1	(Argentina) Maximiliano Estévez	(Venezuela) Ricardo Rodríguez (Italy) Claudio Grassi	(Italy) Erik Crepaldi (El Salvador) Marcelo Arévalo (Peru) Mauricio Echazú (Italy) Enrico Fioravante
October 29	Venezuela F5 Futures; Maracaibo, Venezuela; Hard $15,000; Singles draw - Doubles draw	(France) Simon Cauvard (Madagascar) Antso Rakotondramanga; 1–0 Ret.	(Italy) Enrico Fioravante (Italy) Claudio Grassi	(Venezuela) Ricardo Rodríguez (Italy) Claudio Grassi	(Italy) Erik Crepaldi (El Salvador) Marcelo Arévalo (Peru) Mauricio Echazú (Italy) Enrico Fioravante

== November ==
Week of	Tournament	Winner	Runners-up	Semifinalists	Quarterfinalists
November 5	Brazil F33 Futures; São Paulo, Brazil; Clay $10,000; Singles draw - Doubles draw	(Brazil) Daniel Dutra da Silva; 6–3, 3–6, 6–3	(Brazil) André Miele	(Brazil) Alexandre Tsuchiya (Brazil) Eduardo Dischinger	(Argentina) Joaquín-Jesús Monteferrario (Brazil) Felipe Brandão (Brazil) Carlos Eduardo Severino (Sweden) Christian Lindell
November 5	Brazil F33 Futures; São Paulo, Brazil; Clay $10,000; Singles draw - Doubles draw	(Brazil) André Miele (Brazil) Alexandre Tsuchiya; 6–4, 7–6^{(7–3)}	(Brazil) Daniel Dutra da Silva (Argentina) Joaquín-Jesús Monteferrario	(Brazil) Alexandre Tsuchiya (Brazil) Eduardo Dischinger	(Argentina) Joaquín-Jesús Monteferrario (Brazil) Felipe Brandão (Brazil) Carlos Eduardo Severino (Sweden) Christian Lindell
November 5	Czech Republic F8 Futures; Opava, Czech Republic; Carpet $10,000; Singles draw - Doubles draw	(United Kingdom) Neil Pauffley; 6–4, 2–6, 6–4	(Czech Republic) Roman Jebavý	(Czech Republic) Marek Michalička (Czech Republic) Michal Konečný	(Poland) Andriej Kapaś (Czech Republic) Otakar Lucák (Belarus) Alexander Bury (Czech Republic) Jan Šátral
November 5	Czech Republic F8 Futures; Opava, Czech Republic; Carpet $10,000; Singles draw - Doubles draw	(Czech Republic) Otakar Lucák (Czech Republic) Pavel Šnobel; 6–2, 6–7^{(5–7)}, [10–4]	(Belarus) Alexander Bury (Poland) Andriej Kapaś	(Czech Republic) Marek Michalička (Czech Republic) Michal Konečný	(Poland) Andriej Kapaś (Czech Republic) Otakar Lucák (Belarus) Alexander Bury (Czech Republic) Jan Šátral
November 5	Greece F6 Futures; Heraklion, Greece; Carpet $10,000; Singles draw - Doubles draw	(Germany) Robin Kern; 6–1, 3–1, Ret.	(Spain) Iván Arenas-Gualda	(Greece) Theodoros Angelinos (Greece) Alexandros Jakupovic	(France) Enzo Couacaud (Italy) Matteo Donati (Spain) Ricardo Villacorta-Alonso (France) Yannick Jankovits
November 5	Greece F6 Futures; Heraklion, Greece; Carpet $10,000; Singles draw - Doubles draw	(Serbia) Nikola Čačić (Croatia) Mate Delić; 7–5, 6–2	(Belgium) Julien Dubail (Belgium) Yannick Vandenbulcke	(Greece) Theodoros Angelinos (Greece) Alexandros Jakupovic	(France) Enzo Couacaud (Italy) Matteo Donati (Spain) Ricardo Villacorta-Alonso (France) Yannick Jankovits
November 5	Mexico F13 Futures; Mérida, Mexico; Hard $10,000; Singles draw - Doubles draw	(France) Lucas Pouille; 6–4, 6–1	(France) Mathias Bourgue	(Guatemala) Christopher Díaz Figueroa (Mexico) Miguel Gallardo-Valles	(United States) Chris Wettengel (Italy) Roberto Marcora (Haiti) Olivier Sajous (El Salvador) Marcelo Arévalo
November 5	Mexico F13 Futures; Mérida, Mexico; Hard $10,000; Singles draw - Doubles draw	(Switzerland) Riccardo Maiga (Italy) Roberto Marcora; 6–1, 2–6, [10–7]	(Guatemala) Christopher Díaz Figueroa (Dominican Republic) José Hernández	(Guatemala) Christopher Díaz Figueroa (Mexico) Miguel Gallardo-Valles	(United States) Chris Wettengel (Italy) Roberto Marcora (Haiti) Olivier Sajous (El Salvador) Marcelo Arévalo
November 5	Thailand F5 Futures; Phuket, Thailand; Hard $10,000; Singles draw - Doubles draw	(Australia) Dane Propoggia; 6–3, 6–4	(Sweden) Robin Olin	(Russia) Philip Davydenko (France) Antoine Escoffier	(Sweden) Milos Sekulic (Indonesia) Elbert Sie (United Kingdom) Alexander Ward (China) Wang Chuhan
November 5	Thailand F5 Futures; Phuket, Thailand; Hard $10,000; Singles draw - Doubles draw	(Australia) Brydan Klein (Australia) Dane Propoggia; 6–3, 6–2	(France) Antoine Escoffier (United Kingdom) Alexander Ward	(Russia) Philip Davydenko (France) Antoine Escoffier	(Sweden) Milos Sekulic (Indonesia) Elbert Sie (United Kingdom) Alexander Ward (China) Wang Chuhan
November 5	Turkey F43 Futures; Antalya-Kaya Belek, Turkey; Hard $10,000; Singles draw - Doubles draw	(Bosnia and Herzegovina) Aldin Šetkić; 1–6, 6–2, 6–1	(Ukraine) Artem Smirnov	(France) Jules Marie (Belgium) Yannik Reuter	(Belgium) Joris De Loore (Ukraine) Volodymyr Uzhylovskyi (Serbia) Denis Bejtulahi (Germany) Marc Meigel
November 5	Turkey F43 Futures; Antalya-Kaya Belek, Turkey; Hard $10,000; Singles draw - Doubles draw	(Ukraine) Artem Smirnov (Ukraine) Volodymyr Uzhylovskyi; 6–7 ^{(3–7)}, 7–6^{(7–3)}, [10–6]	(Belgium) Germain Gigounon (Belgium) Yannik Reuter	(France) Jules Marie (Belgium) Yannik Reuter	(Belgium) Joris De Loore (Ukraine) Volodymyr Uzhylovskyi (Serbia) Denis Bejtulahi (Germany) Marc Meigel
November 5	USA F31 Futures; Niceville, USA; Clay $10,000; Singles draw - Doubles draw	(United States) Chase Buchanan; 3–6, 7–6^{(7–4)}, 7–5	(United Kingdom) Kyle Edmund	(France) Florian Reynet (New Zealand) Artem Sitak	(France) Romain Arneodo (United States) Jason Jung (United States) Bjorn Fratangelo (United States) Ryan Thacher
November 5	USA F31 Futures; Niceville, USA; Clay $10,000; Singles draw - Doubles draw	(United States) Jason Jung (United States) Ryan Thacher; 7–5, 6–2	(New Zealand) Artem Sitak (Belarus) Andrei Vasilevski	(France) Florian Reynet (New Zealand) Artem Sitak	(France) Romain Arneodo (United States) Jason Jung (United States) Bjorn Fratangelo (United States) Ryan Thacher
November 12	Brazil F30 Futures; Lins, Brazil; Clay $15,000; Singles draw - Doubles draw	(Brazil) Bruno Sant'Anna; 6–1, 6–1	(Argentina) Maximiliano Estévez	(Brazil) Guilherme Clezar (Italy) Gianluigi Quinzi	(Argentina) Patricio Heras (Brazil) Carlos Eduardo Severino (Brazil) Tiago Lopes (Chile) Hans Podlipnik-Castillo
November 12	Brazil F30 Futures; Lins, Brazil; Clay $15,000; Singles draw - Doubles draw	(Brazil) Guilherme Clezar (Brazil) Fabrício Neis; 6–4, 6–7^{(5–7)}, [10–7]	(Brazil) Rodrigo-Antonio Grilli (Brazil) Diego Matos	(Brazil) Guilherme Clezar (Italy) Gianluigi Quinzi	(Argentina) Patricio Heras (Brazil) Carlos Eduardo Severino (Brazil) Tiago Lopes (Chile) Hans Podlipnik-Castillo
November 12	Burundi F1 Futures; Bujumbura, Burundi; Clay $10,000; Singles draw - Doubles draw	(Austria) Gerald Melzer; 6–2, 6–3	(Italy) Alessandro Bega	(Italy) Riccardo Sinicropi (Italy) Lorenzo Papasidero	(Serbia) Slobodan Jevtić (Switzerland) Lucas Zweili (Burundi) Hassan Ndayishimiye (Morocco) Hicham Khaddari
November 12	Burundi F1 Futures; Bujumbura, Burundi; Clay $10,000; Singles draw - Doubles draw	(Austria) Lukas Jastraunig (Netherlands) Mark Vervoort; 6–4, 3–6, [10–8]	(Italy) Alessandro Bega (Italy) Riccardo Sinicropi	(Italy) Riccardo Sinicropi (Italy) Lorenzo Papasidero	(Serbia) Slobodan Jevtić (Switzerland) Lucas Zweili (Burundi) Hassan Ndayishimiye (Morocco) Hicham Khaddari
November 12	Czech Republic F9 Futures; Jablonec nad Nisou, Czech Republic; Carpet $10,000; Singles draw - Doubles draw	(Slovakia) Miloslav Mečíř; 6–4, 3–6, 7–6^{(7–3)}	(Czech Republic) Marek Michalička	(Belarus) Nikolai Fidirko (Czech Republic) Lubomír Majšajdr	(Czech Republic) Jan Šátral (Czech Republic) Jaroslav Pospíšil (Austria) Nicolas Reissig (Czech Republic) Otakar Lucák
November 12	Czech Republic F9 Futures; Jablonec nad Nisou, Czech Republic; Carpet $10,000; Singles draw - Doubles draw	(Czech Republic) Petr Kovačka (Czech Republic) Marek Michalička; 6–3, 6–4	(Czech Republic) Lukáš Maršoun (Czech Republic) Dominik Süč	(Belarus) Nikolai Fidirko (Czech Republic) Lubomír Majšajdr	(Czech Republic) Jan Šátral (Czech Republic) Jaroslav Pospíšil (Austria) Nicolas Reissig (Czech Republic) Otakar Lucák
November 12	Greece F7 Futures; Heraklion, Greece; Carpet $10,000; Singles draw - Doubles draw	(Croatia) Mate Delić; 6–4, 7–6^{(7–3)}	(Serbia) Nikola Čačić	(Belgium) Julien Dubail (Greece) Alexandros Jakupovic	(Russia) Victor Baluda (Greece) Theodoros Angelinos (Italy) Viktor Galović (Italy) Giacomo Oradini
November 12	Greece F7 Futures; Heraklion, Greece; Carpet $10,000; Singles draw - Doubles draw	(Serbia) Nikola Čačić (Croatia) Mate Delić; 6–1, 6–2	(France) Enzo Couacaud (Belgium) Julien Dubail	(Belgium) Julien Dubail (Greece) Alexandros Jakupovic	(Russia) Victor Baluda (Greece) Theodoros Angelinos (Italy) Viktor Galović (Italy) Giacomo Oradini
November 12	Mexico F14 Futures; Mérida, Mexico; Hard $10,000; Singles draw - Doubles draw	(France) Lucas Pouille; 6–3, 6–3	(Canada) Filip Peliwo	(Mexico) Miguel Gallardo-Valles (Barbados) Darian King	(Colombia) Nicolás Barrientos (Guatemala) Christopher Díaz Figueroa (France) Mathias Bourgue (Venezuela) Luis David Martínez
November 12	Mexico F14 Futures; Mérida, Mexico; Hard $10,000; Singles draw - Doubles draw	(Australia) Yuri Bezeruk (Barbados) Darian King; 6–3, 6–1	(Mexico) Mauricio Astorga (New Zealand) Marvin Barker	(Mexico) Miguel Gallardo-Valles (Barbados) Darian King	(Colombia) Nicolás Barrientos (Guatemala) Christopher Díaz Figueroa (France) Mathias Bourgue (Venezuela) Luis David Martínez
November 12	Thailand F6 Futures; Phuket, Thailand; Hard $10,000; Singles draw - Doubles draw	(United Kingdom) Alexander Ward; 6–3, 6–1	(Russia) Mikhail Fufygin	(France) Antoine Escoffier (Australia) Ryan Agar	(United Kingdom) Marcus Willis (Thailand) Nuttanon Kadchapanan (Sweden) Robin Olin (China) Lu Yang
November 12	Thailand F6 Futures; Phuket, Thailand; Hard $10,000; Singles draw - Doubles draw	(Australia) Ryan Agar (Austria) Sebastian Bader; 7–6^{(7–2)}, 2–6, [10–8]	(France) Antoine Escoffier (United Kingdom) Alexander Ward	(France) Antoine Escoffier (Australia) Ryan Agar	(United Kingdom) Marcus Willis (Thailand) Nuttanon Kadchapanan (Sweden) Robin Olin (China) Lu Yang
November 12	Turkey F44 Futures; Antalya-Kaya Belek, Turkey; Hard $10,000; Singles draw - Doubles draw	(Turkey) Marsel İlhan; 6–3, 6–2	(Belgium) Yannik Reuter	(Switzerland) Stéphane Bohli (Ukraine) Volodymyr Uzhylovskyi	(Serbia) Miljan Zekić (Bosnia and Herzegovina) Aldin Šetkić (Germany) Marc Sieber (Belgium) Germain Gigounon
November 12	Turkey F44 Futures; Antalya-Kaya Belek, Turkey; Hard $10,000; Singles draw - Doubles draw	(Belgium) Julien Cagnina (Belgium) Arthur De Greef; 6–1, 6–7^{(3–7)}, [10–5]	(Austria) Michael Linzer (Germany) Marc Sieber	(Switzerland) Stéphane Bohli (Ukraine) Volodymyr Uzhylovskyi	(Serbia) Miljan Zekić (Bosnia and Herzegovina) Aldin Šetkić (Germany) Marc Sieber (Belgium) Germain Gigounon
November 12	USA F32 Futures; Bradenton, USA; Clay $10,000; Singles draw - Doubles draw	(France) Florian Reynet; 6–0, 6–1	(Germany) Alexander Zverev	(Belgium) Alexandre Folie (United Kingdom) Luke Bambridge	(United States) Bjorn Fratangelo (Tunisia) Mohamed Abid (United States) Sekou Bangoura (Mexico) Daniel Garza
November 12	USA F32 Futures; Bradenton, USA; Clay $10,000; Singles draw - Doubles draw	(Tunisia) Mohamed Abid (United States) Ryan Thacher; 6–3, 3–6, [10–4]	(France) Romain Arneodo (Monaco) Benjamin Balleret	(Belgium) Alexandre Folie (United Kingdom) Luke Bambridge	(United States) Bjorn Fratangelo (Tunisia) Mohamed Abid (United States) Sekou Bangoura (Mexico) Daniel Garza
November 19	Argentina F26 Futures; Rosario, Argentina; Carpet $10,000; Singles draw - Doubles draw	(Argentina) Renzo Olivo; 3–6, 6–2, 6–4	(Argentina) Guillermo Durán	(Argentina) Andrea Collarini (Argentina) Andrés Molteni	(Argentina) Leandro Migani (Argentina) Pablo Galdón (Argentina) Leonel Videla (Argentina) Juan-Pablo Amado
November 19	Argentina F26 Futures; Rosario, Argentina; Carpet $10,000; Singles draw - Doubles draw	(Japan) Ryusei Makiguchi (Bolivia) Federico Zeballos; 6–4, 2–6, [10–6]	(Argentina) Andrés Molteni (Argentina) Juan Vazquez-Valenzuela	(Argentina) Andrea Collarini (Argentina) Andrés Molteni	(Argentina) Leandro Migani (Argentina) Pablo Galdón (Argentina) Leonel Videla (Argentina) Juan-Pablo Amado
November 19	Brazil F34 Futures; Foz do Iguaçu, Brazil; Clay $10,000; Singles draw - Doubles draw	(Chile) Hans Podlipnik-Castillo; 6–4, 6–4	(Argentina) Patricio Heras	(Brazil) Fabiano de Paula (Brazil) Fabrício Neis	(Brazil) Joao Wiesinger (Brazil) Nicolas Santos (Brazil) André Miele (Brazil) Pedro Zerbini
November 19	Brazil F34 Futures; Foz do Iguaçu, Brazil; Clay $10,000; Singles draw - Doubles draw	(Brazil) Fabrício Neis (Brazil) Nicolas Santos; 6–4, 6–3	(Argentina) Patricio Heras (Brazil) Diego Matos	(Brazil) Fabiano de Paula (Brazil) Fabrício Neis	(Brazil) Joao Wiesinger (Brazil) Nicolas Santos (Brazil) André Miele (Brazil) Pedro Zerbini
November 19	Cambodia F1 Futures; Phnom Penh, Cambodia; Hard $10,000; Singles draw - Doubles draw	(Austria) Maximilian Neuchrist; 1–6, 6–1, 6–4	(France) Axel Michon	(New Zealand) Artem Sitak (United States) Mico Santiago	(France) Sébastien Boltz (France) Antoine Escoffier (Japan) Katsushi Fukuda (Croatia) Marin Bradarić
November 19	Cambodia F1 Futures; Phnom Penh, Cambodia; Hard $10,000; Singles draw - Doubles draw	(New Zealand) Marcus Daniell (United Kingdom) Richard Gabb; 6–0, 6–0	(China) Gao Peng (China) Gao Wan	(New Zealand) Artem Sitak (United States) Mico Santiago	(France) Sébastien Boltz (France) Antoine Escoffier (Japan) Katsushi Fukuda (Croatia) Marin Bradarić
November 19	Chile F12 Futures; Curicó, Chile; Clay $10,000; Singles draw - Doubles draw	(Chile) Guillermo Rivera Aránguiz; 6–4, 6–4	(Italy) Gianluigi Quinzi	(Chile) Jorge Aguilar (Chile) Juan Carlos Sáez	(Chile) Gonzalo Lama (Chile) Ricardo Urzúa-Rivera (Chile) Cristóbal Saavedra-Corvalán (Argentina) Maximiliano Estévez
November 19	Chile F12 Futures; Curicó, Chile; Clay $10,000; Singles draw - Doubles draw	(Chile) Guillermo Rivera Aránguiz (Chile) Cristóbal Saavedra-Corvalán; 6–3, 5–7, [10–7]	(Bolivia) Mauricio Doria-Medina (Chile) Ricardo Urzúa-Rivera	(Chile) Jorge Aguilar (Chile) Juan Carlos Sáez	(Chile) Gonzalo Lama (Chile) Ricardo Urzúa-Rivera (Chile) Cristóbal Saavedra-Corvalán (Argentina) Maximiliano Estévez
November 19	Mexico F15 Futures; Mazatlán, Mexico; Hard $10,000; Singles draw - Doubles draw	(Colombia) Michael Quintero; 6–1, 6–7^{(4–7)}, 1–0 Ret.	(El Salvador) Marcelo Arévalo	(Colombia) Nicolás Barrientos (Mexico) Miguel Gallardo-Valles	(Venezuela) Luis David Martínez (Australia) Matheson Klein (Mexico) Miguel Ángel Reyes-Varela (Mexico) Daniel Garza
November 19	Mexico F15 Futures; Mazatlán, Mexico; Hard $10,000; Singles draw - Doubles draw	(Mexico) Javier Herrera-Eguiluz (Australia) Matheson Klein; 4–6, 6–1, [10–8]	(Mexico) Tigre Hank (United States) Dante Saleh	(Colombia) Nicolás Barrientos (Mexico) Miguel Gallardo-Valles	(Venezuela) Luis David Martínez (Australia) Matheson Klein (Mexico) Miguel Ángel Reyes-Varela (Mexico) Daniel Garza
November 19	Morocco F9 Futures; Fes, Morocco; Clay $15,000; Singles draw - Doubles draw	(Austria) Dominic Thiem; 6–3, 6–1	(Italy) Alberto Brizzi	(Spain) Enrique López-Pérez (France) Yannick Thivant	(Netherlands) Boy Westerhof (Slovakia) Jozef Kovalík (Algeria) Lamine Ouahab (Morocco) Younès Rachidi
November 19	Morocco F9 Futures; Fes, Morocco; Clay $15,000; Singles draw - Doubles draw	(Spain) Juan-Samuel Arauzo-Martínez (Spain) Enrique López-Pérez; 6–2, 5–7, [10–7]	(Italy) Riccardo Bellotti (Austria) Dominic Thiem	(Spain) Enrique López-Pérez (France) Yannick Thivant	(Netherlands) Boy Westerhof (Slovakia) Jozef Kovalík (Algeria) Lamine Ouahab (Morocco) Younès Rachidi
November 19	Rwanda F1 Futures; Kigali, Rwanda; Clay $10,000; Singles draw - Doubles draw	(Austria) Christian Magg; 7–6^{(7–3)}, 6–3	(Austria) Gerald Melzer	(Venezuela) Jordi Muñoz Abreu (Italy) Luca Pancaldi	(Italy) Francesco Picco (Netherlands) Mark Vervoort (Austria) Lukas Jastraunig (Burundi) Hassan Ndayishimiye
November 19	Rwanda F1 Futures; Kigali, Rwanda; Clay $10,000; Singles draw - Doubles draw	(Austria) Lukas Jastraunig (Austria) Gerald Melzer; 6–2, 7–5	(Italy) Davide Melchiorre (Italy) Francesco Picco	(Venezuela) Jordi Muñoz Abreu (Italy) Luca Pancaldi	(Italy) Francesco Picco (Netherlands) Mark Vervoort (Austria) Lukas Jastraunig (Burundi) Hassan Ndayishimiye
November 19	Turkey F45 Futures; Antalya-Kaya Belek, Turkey; Hard $10,000; Singles draw - Doubles draw	(Bosnia and Herzegovina) Aldin Šetkić; 6–2, 1–0 Ret.	(Belgium) Arthur De Greef	(Spain) Jordi Samper-Montaña (Switzerland) Yann Marti	(Belgium) Julien Cagnina (Romania) Alexandru Catalin Marasin (Austria) Michael Linzer (Turkey) Marsel İlhan
November 19	Turkey F45 Futures; Antalya-Kaya Belek, Turkey; Hard $10,000; Singles draw - Doubles draw	(Spain) Guillermo Olaso (Spain) Jordi Samper-Montaña; 6–7^{(5–7)}, 6–1, [10–4]	(Croatia) Duje Kekez (Croatia) Luka Zaninović	(Spain) Jordi Samper-Montaña (Switzerland) Yann Marti	(Belgium) Julien Cagnina (Romania) Alexandru Catalin Marasin (Austria) Michael Linzer (Turkey) Marsel İlhan
November 26	Argentina F27 Futures; Buenos Aires, Argentina; Clay $10,000; Singles draw - Doubles draw	(Argentina) Patricio Heras; 3–6, 7–6^{(10–8)}, 6–4	(Argentina) Andrea Collarini	(Argentina) Juan-Pablo Amado (Argentina) Guillermo Durán	(Argentina) Leandro Migani (Italy) Stefano Travaglia (Argentina) Joaquín-Jesús Monteferrario (Argentina) Juan Vazquez-Valenzuela
November 26	Argentina F27 Futures; Buenos Aires, Argentina; Clay $10,000; Singles draw - Doubles draw	(Argentina) Facundo Mena (Argentina) Leandro Migani; 6–3, 6–3	(Argentina) Juan Ignacio Londero (Argentina) Mateo Nicolás Martínez	(Argentina) Juan-Pablo Amado (Argentina) Guillermo Durán	(Argentina) Leandro Migani (Italy) Stefano Travaglia (Argentina) Joaquín-Jesús Monteferrario (Argentina) Juan Vazquez-Valenzuela
November 26	Brazil F35 Futures; Gramado, Brazil; Hard $10,000; Singles draw - Doubles draw	(Brazil) Marcelo Demoliner; 7–5, 6–3	(Brazil) Pedro Zerbini	(Brazil) André Miele (Brazil) Nicolas Santos	(Brazil) Fabrício Neis (Brazil) Ricardo Siggia (Brazil) Bruno Sant'Anna (Brazil) Alexandre Tsuchiya
November 26	Brazil F35 Futures; Gramado, Brazil; Hard $10,000; Singles draw - Doubles draw	(Brazil) Fabrício Neis (Brazil) Nicolas Santos; 5–7, 6–4, [10–4]	(Brazil) Marcelo Demoliner (Brazil) Caio Zampieri	(Brazil) André Miele (Brazil) Nicolas Santos	(Brazil) Fabrício Neis (Brazil) Ricardo Siggia (Brazil) Bruno Sant'Anna (Brazil) Alexandre Tsuchiya
November 26	Cambodia F2 Futures; Phnom Penh, Cambodia; Hard $10,000; Singles draw - Doubles draw	(New Zealand) Artem Sitak; 6–4, 6–7^{(3–7)}, 7–6^{(7–4)}	(United Kingdom) Alexander Ward	(Chinese Taipei) Chen Ti (France) Axel Michon	(Algeria) Mehdi Bouras (Israel) Dekel Bar (Austria) Maximilian Neuchrist (India) Jeevan Nedunchezhiyan
November 26	Cambodia F2 Futures; Phnom Penh, Cambodia; Hard $10,000; Singles draw - Doubles draw	(New Zealand) Marcus Daniell (United Kingdom) Richard Gabb; 6–1, 7–6^{(7–5)}	(China) Gao Wan (India) Jeevan Nedunchezhiyan	(Chinese Taipei) Chen Ti (France) Axel Michon	(Algeria) Mehdi Bouras (Israel) Dekel Bar (Austria) Maximilian Neuchrist (India) Jeevan Nedunchezhiyan
November 26	Chile F13 Futures; Curicó, Chile; Clay $10,000; Singles draw - Doubles draw	(Chile) Juan Carlos Sáez; 6–3, 4–6, 6–1	(Spain) Albert Alcaraz-Ivorra	(Chile) Jorge Aguilar (Chile) Guillermo Rivera Aránguiz	(Croatia) Borut Puc (Chile) Cristóbal Saavedra-Corvalán (Peru) Mauricio Echazú (Argentina) Santiago Maccio
November 26	Chile F13 Futures; Curicó, Chile; Clay $10,000; Singles draw - Doubles draw	(Chile) Jorge Aguilar (Chile) Juan Carlos Sáez; 6–2, 6–2	(Chile) Guillermo Rivera Aránguiz (Chile) Cristóbal Saavedra-Corvalán	(Chile) Jorge Aguilar (Chile) Guillermo Rivera Aránguiz	(Croatia) Borut Puc (Chile) Cristóbal Saavedra-Corvalán (Peru) Mauricio Echazú (Argentina) Santiago Maccio
November 26	Indonesia F3 Futures; Jakarta, Indonesia; Hard $15,000; Singles draw - Doubles draw	(Indonesia) Christopher Rungkat; 6–4, 7–5	(South Korea) Jeong Suk-young	(Australia) Brydan Klein (Australia) Dane Propoggia	(Germany) Tim Pütz (Indonesia) Irfandi Hendrawan (Republic of Ireland) James McGee (Czech Republic) Roman Jebavý
November 26	Indonesia F3 Futures; Jakarta, Indonesia; Hard $15,000; Singles draw - Doubles draw	(Germany) Tim Pütz (New Zealand) Michael Venus; 7–5, 6–3	(Australia) Brydan Klein (Australia) Dane Propoggia	(Australia) Brydan Klein (Australia) Dane Propoggia	(Germany) Tim Pütz (Indonesia) Irfandi Hendrawan (Republic of Ireland) James McGee (Czech Republic) Roman Jebavý
November 26	Morocco F10 Futures; Oujda, Morocco; Clay $15,000; Singles draw - Doubles draw	(Austria) Dominic Thiem; 7–6^{(7–4)}, 6–1	(Italy) Riccardo Bellotti	(Spain) Pablo Carreño Busta (France) Florian Reynet	(Algeria) Lamine Ouahab (Morocco) Younès Rachidi (Hungary) Márton Fucsovics (Morocco) Anas Fattar
November 26	Morocco F10 Futures; Oujda, Morocco; Clay $15,000; Singles draw - Doubles draw	(Hungary) Márton Fucsovics (Republic of Ireland) Daniel Glancy; 6–2, 6–3	(Italy) Riccardo Bellotti (Austria) Dominic Thiem	(Spain) Pablo Carreño Busta (France) Florian Reynet	(Algeria) Lamine Ouahab (Morocco) Younès Rachidi (Hungary) Márton Fucsovics (Morocco) Anas Fattar
November 26	Rwanda F2 Futures; Kigali, Rwanda; Clay $10,000; Singles draw - Doubles draw	(Austria) Gerald Melzer; 6–4, 6–4	(Egypt) Sherif Sabry	(Austria) Lukas Jastraunig (Italy) Riccardo Sinicropi	(Venezuela) Jordi Muñoz Abreu (Italy) Alessandro Petrone (Russia) Alexander Igoshin (Morocco) Hicham Khaddari
November 26	Rwanda F2 Futures; Kigali, Rwanda; Clay $10,000; Singles draw - Doubles draw	(Austria) Lukas Jastraunig (Austria) Gerald Melzer; 3–6, 6–3, [10–3]	(Venezuela) Jordi Muñoz Abreu (Netherlands) Mark Vervoort	(Austria) Lukas Jastraunig (Italy) Riccardo Sinicropi	(Venezuela) Jordi Muñoz Abreu (Italy) Alessandro Petrone (Russia) Alexander Igoshin (Morocco) Hicham Khaddari
November 26	Turkey F46 Futures; Antalya-Kaya Belek, Turkey; Hard $10,000; Singles draw - Doubles draw	(Switzerland) Michael Lammer; 6–1, 1–6, 7–5	(Spain) Guillermo Olaso	(Croatia) Dino Marcan (Spain) Jordi Samper-Montaña	(Netherlands) Jesse Huta Galung (Bosnia and Herzegovina) Aldin Šetkić (Slovakia) Marek Semjan (Turkey) Marsel İlhan
November 26	Turkey F46 Futures; Antalya-Kaya Belek, Turkey; Hard $10,000; Singles draw - Doubles draw	(Slovakia) Marek Semjan (Slovakia) Jan Simon; 2–6, 7–6^{(12–10)}, [10–7]	(Switzerland) Michael Lammer (Belgium) Jeroen Vanneste	(Croatia) Dino Marcan (Spain) Jordi Samper-Montaña	(Netherlands) Jesse Huta Galung (Bosnia and Herzegovina) Aldin Šetkić (Slovakia) Marek Semjan (Turkey) Marsel İlhan
November 26	Zimbabwe F1 Futures; Harare, Zimbabwe; Hard $10,000; Singles draw - Doubles draw	(Zimbabwe) Takanyi Garanganga; 6–3, 7–6^{(10–8)}	(South Africa) Keith-Patrick Crowley	(South Africa) Ruan Roelofse (United States) Evan Song	(Czech Republic) Lukáš Maršoun (Italy) Matteo Marfia (Italy) Emanuele Molina (Zimbabwe) Mark Fynn
November 26	Zimbabwe F1 Futures; Harare, Zimbabwe; Hard $10,000; Singles draw - Doubles draw	(South Africa) Keith-Patrick Crowley (South Africa) Ruan Roelofse; 3–6, 6–3, [10–5]	(United States) Joel Kincaid (United States) Evan Song	(South Africa) Ruan Roelofse (United States) Evan Song	(Czech Republic) Lukáš Maršoun (Italy) Matteo Marfia (Italy) Emanuele Molina (Zimbabwe) Mark Fynn

== December ==
Week of	Tournament	Winner	Runners-up	Semifinalists	Quarterfinalists
December 3	Argentina F28 Futures; Rio Cuarto, Argentina; Clay $10,000; Singles draw - Doubles draw	(Argentina) Guillermo Durán; 6–2, 7–5	(Argentina) Gabriel Alejandro Hidalgo	(Argentina) Leandro Migani (Argentina) Mauricio Pérez Mota	(Bolivia) Federico Zeballos (Argentina) Andrés Molteni (Argentina) Hernán Casanova (Argentina) Fabricio Burdisso
December 3	Argentina F28 Futures; Rio Cuarto, Argentina; Clay $10,000; Singles draw - Doubles draw	(Peru) Sergio Galdós (Argentina) Mateo Nicolás Martínez; 7–6^{(7–3)}, 6–4	(Argentina) Franco Agamenone (Argentina) José Ángel Carrizo	(Argentina) Leandro Migani (Argentina) Mauricio Pérez Mota	(Bolivia) Federico Zeballos (Argentina) Andrés Molteni (Argentina) Hernán Casanova (Argentina) Fabricio Burdisso
December 3	Brazil F36 Futures; Porto Alegre, Brazil; Clay $10,000; Singles draw - Doubles draw	(Brazil) Tiago Lopes; 6–4, 6–2	(Brazil) Marcelo Demoliner	(Brazil) Augusto Laranja (Brazil) Eduardo Dischinger	(Brazil) Pedro Zerbini (Brazil) Nicolas Santos (Brazil) Alexandre Tsuchiya (Brazil) Wilson Leite
December 3	Brazil F36 Futures; Porto Alegre, Brazil; Clay $10,000; Singles draw - Doubles draw	(Brazil) Augusto Laranja (Brazil) Caio Silva; 3–6, 6–4, [12–10]	(Brazil) Fabrício Neis (Brazil) Nicolas Santos	(Brazil) Augusto Laranja (Brazil) Eduardo Dischinger	(Brazil) Pedro Zerbini (Brazil) Nicolas Santos (Brazil) Alexandre Tsuchiya (Brazil) Wilson Leite
December 3	Cambodia F3 Futures; Phnom Penh, Cambodia; Hard $10,000; Singles draw - Doubles draw	(Germany) Robin Kern; 6–4, 6–4	(France) Axel Michon	(China) Wang Chuhan (China) Gao Peng	(Chinese Taipei) Chuang Ting Yu (France) Antoine Escoffier (Croatia) Filip Veger (Chinese Taipei) Wang Chieh-fu
December 3	Cambodia F3 Futures; Phnom Penh, Cambodia; Hard $10,000; Singles draw - Doubles draw	(New Zealand) Marcus Daniell (United Kingdom) Richard Gabb; 7–5, 6–2	(China) Gao Peng (China) Gao Wan	(China) Wang Chuhan (China) Gao Peng	(Chinese Taipei) Chuang Ting Yu (France) Antoine Escoffier (Croatia) Filip Veger (Chinese Taipei) Wang Chieh-fu
December 3	Chile F14 Futures; Temuco, Chile; Clay $10,000; Singles draw - Doubles draw	(Chile) Hans Podlipnik-Castillo; 6–3, 7–5	(Chile) Jorge Aguilar	(Spain) Albert Alcaraz Ivorra (Chile) Cristóbal Saavedra-Corvalán	(Chile) Nicolás Gustavo Kauer (Chile) Juan Carlos Sáez (Bolivia) Mauricio Doria-Medina (Chile) Felipe Ríos
December 3	Chile F14 Futures; Temuco, Chile; Clay $10,000; Singles draw - Doubles draw	(Argentina) Nicolás Kicker (Argentina) José María Paniagua; 7–5, 6–2	(Chile) Hans Podlipnik-Castillo (Chile) Ricardo Urzúa-Rivera	(Spain) Albert Alcaraz Ivorra (Chile) Cristóbal Saavedra-Corvalán	(Chile) Nicolás Gustavo Kauer (Chile) Juan Carlos Sáez (Bolivia) Mauricio Doria-Medina (Chile) Felipe Ríos
December 3	Hong Kong F1 Futures; Hong Kong, Hong Kong; Hard $10,000; Singles draw - Doubles draw	(Russia) Victor Baluda; 6–4, 6–2	(Australia) Alex Bolt	(United States) Sekou Bangoura (United States) Jason Jung	(France) Davy Sum (Hong Kong) Kevin Kung (South Korea) Im Kyu-tae (France) Michael Bois
December 3	Hong Kong F1 Futures; Hong Kong, Hong Kong; Hard $10,000; Singles draw - Doubles draw	(United States) Jason Jung (United States) Ryan Thacher; 6–1, 6–1	(Russia) Victor Baluda (Russia) Evgeny Karlovskiy	(United States) Sekou Bangoura (United States) Jason Jung	(France) Davy Sum (Hong Kong) Kevin Kung (South Korea) Im Kyu-tae (France) Michael Bois
December 3	India F15 Futures; Davanagere, India; Hard $10,000; Singles draw - Doubles draw	(India) Sanam Singh; 6–2, 7–6^{(7–4)}	(India) Sriram Balaji	(Netherlands) Colin van Beem (Germany) Torsten Wietoska	(Netherlands) Jeroen Benard (India) Jeevan Nedunchezhiyan (India) Ranjeet Virali-Murugesan (India) Mohit Mayur Jayaprakash
December 3	India F15 Futures; Davanagere, India; Hard $10,000; Singles draw - Doubles draw	(India) Sriram Balaji (India) Jeevan Nedunchezhiyan; 6–7^{(4–7)}, 6–4, [10–1]	(India) Vijay Sundar Prashanth (India) Arun-Prakash Rajagopalan	(Netherlands) Colin van Beem (Germany) Torsten Wietoska	(Netherlands) Jeroen Benard (India) Jeevan Nedunchezhiyan (India) Ranjeet Virali-Murugesan (India) Mohit Mayur Jayaprakash
December 3	Indonesia F4 Futures; Jakarta, Indonesia; Hard $15,000; Singles draw - Doubles draw	(Croatia) Mate Pavić; 6–4, 6–7^{(2–7)}, 7–6^{(7–5)}	(Australia) Brydan Klein	(Austria) Nicolas Reissig (Republic of Ireland) James McGee	(Germany) Tim Pütz (Australia) Dane Propoggia (South Korea) Chung Hyeon (Indonesia) Christopher Rungkat
December 3	Indonesia F4 Futures; Jakarta, Indonesia; Hard $15,000; Singles draw - Doubles draw	(Australia) Brydan Klein (Australia) Dane Propoggia; 6–4, 6–2	(Indonesia) Nesa Arta (Indonesia) Hendri Susilo Pramono	(Austria) Nicolas Reissig (Republic of Ireland) James McGee	(Germany) Tim Pütz (Australia) Dane Propoggia (South Korea) Chung Hyeon (Indonesia) Christopher Rungkat
December 3	South Africa F1 Futures; Potchefstroom, South Africa; Hard $10,000; Singles draw - Doubles draw	(France) Simon Cauvard; 6–3, 6–4	(South Africa) Rik de Voest	(France) Élie Rousset (South Africa) Nikala Scholtz	(South Africa) Jean Andersen (Zimbabwe) Takanyi Garanganga (South Africa) Ruan Roelofse (Austria) Lukas Weinhandl
December 3	South Africa F1 Futures; Potchefstroom, South Africa; Hard $10,000; Singles draw - Doubles draw	(South Africa) Jean Andersen (South Africa) Ruan Roelofse; 6–1, 4–6, [10–7]	(France) Simon Cauvard (France) Élie Rousset	(France) Élie Rousset (South Africa) Nikala Scholtz	(South Africa) Jean Andersen (Zimbabwe) Takanyi Garanganga (South Africa) Ruan Roelofse (Austria) Lukas Weinhandl
December 3	Turkey F47 Futures; Antalya-Kaya Belek, Turkey; Hard $10,000; Singles draw - Doubles draw	(Georgia (country)) Nikoloz Basilashvili; 3–6, 6–2, 6–2	(Ukraine) Volodymyr Uzhylovskyi	(Croatia) Dino Marcan (Moldova) Maxim Dubarenco	(Spain) Guillermo Olaso (Austria) Dennis Novak (Italy) Lorenzo Giustino (Germany) Marvin Netuschil
December 3	Turkey F47 Futures; Antalya-Kaya Belek, Turkey; Hard $10,000; Singles draw - Doubles draw	(Bosnia and Herzegovina) Tomislav Brkić (Croatia) Dino Marcan; 6–1, 7–6^{(7–5)}	(Moldova) Andrei Ciumac (Ukraine) Volodymyr Uzhylovskyi	(Croatia) Dino Marcan (Moldova) Maxim Dubarenco	(Spain) Guillermo Olaso (Austria) Dennis Novak (Italy) Lorenzo Giustino (Germany) Marvin Netuschil
December 10	Chile F15 Futures; Osorno, Chile; Clay $10,000; Singles draw - Doubles draw	(Chile) Jorge Aguilar; 5–7, 6–3, 6–3	(Chile) Guillermo Rivera Aránguiz	(Chile) Matías Sborowitz (Argentina) Nicolás Kicker	(Brazil) Tiago Lopes (Chile) Juan Matías González Carrasco (Chile) Cristóbal Saavedra-Corvalán (Brazil) Wilson Leite
December 10	Chile F15 Futures; Osorno, Chile; Clay $10,000; Singles draw - Doubles draw	(Brazil) Wilson Leite (Brazil) Tiago Lopes; 7–5, 6–1	(Chile) Guillermo Rivera Aránguiz (Chile) Cristóbal Saavedra-Corvalán	(Chile) Matías Sborowitz (Argentina) Nicolás Kicker	(Brazil) Tiago Lopes (Chile) Juan Matías González Carrasco (Chile) Cristóbal Saavedra-Corvalán (Brazil) Wilson Leite
December 10	Hong Kong F2 Futures; Hong Kong, Hong Kong; Hard $10,000; Singles draw - Doubles draw	(Australia) Alex Bolt; 6–3, 7–5	(Russia) Victor Baluda	(South Korea) Nam Ji-sung (New Zealand) Marcus Daniell	(Australia) James Duckworth (Sweden) Patrik Rosenholm (China) Li Zhe (United States) Sekou Bangoura
December 10	Hong Kong F2 Futures; Hong Kong, Hong Kong; Hard $10,000; Singles draw - Doubles draw	(China) Chang Yu (China) Li Zhe; 6–4, 6–4	(China) Gao Peng (Sweden) Patrik Rosenholm	(South Korea) Nam Ji-sung (New Zealand) Marcus Daniell	(Australia) James Duckworth (Sweden) Patrik Rosenholm (China) Li Zhe (United States) Sekou Bangoura
December 10	India F16 Futures; Dharwad, India; Hard $10,000; Singles draw - Doubles draw	(India) Sanam Singh; 6–2, 7–6^{(7–4)}	(India) Ramkumar Ramanathan	(Germany) Torsten Wietoska (India) Ranjeet Virali-Murugesan	(India) Sriram Balaji (India) Arjun Kadhe (India) Vijay Sundar Prashanth (Netherlands) Colin van Beem
December 10	India F16 Futures; Dharwad, India; Hard $10,000; Singles draw - Doubles draw	(United States) Amrit Narasimhan (United States) Michael Shabaz; 6–4, 3–6, [10–7]	(India) Ajai Selvaraj (India) Ashwin Vijayragawan	(Germany) Torsten Wietoska (India) Ranjeet Virali-Murugesan	(India) Sriram Balaji (India) Arjun Kadhe (India) Vijay Sundar Prashanth (Netherlands) Colin van Beem
December 10	South Africa F2 Futures; Potchefstroom, South Africa; Hard $10,000; Singles draw - Doubles draw	(South Africa) Nikala Scholtz; 6–3, 6–0	(France) Simon Cauvard	(Kuwait) Abdullah Maqdas (South Africa) Tucker Vorster	(United States) Evan Song (Austria) Lukas Weinhandl (South Africa) Keith-Patrick Crowley (United States) Tyler Hochwalt
December 10	South Africa F2 Futures; Potchefstroom, South Africa; Hard $10,000; Singles draw - Doubles draw	(South Africa) Jean Andersen (South Africa) Ruan Roelofse; 7–6^{(7–5)}, 4–6, [10–5]	(France) Simon Cauvard (France) Élie Rousset	(Kuwait) Abdullah Maqdas (South Africa) Tucker Vorster	(United States) Evan Song (Austria) Lukas Weinhandl (South Africa) Keith-Patrick Crowley (United States) Tyler Hochwalt
December 10	Turkey F48 Futures; Antalya-Kaya Belek, Turkey; Hard $10,000; Singles draw - Doubles draw	(Georgia (country)) Nikoloz Basilashvili; 6–2, 6–2	(Spain) Guillermo Olaso	(Germany) Matthias Wunner (France) Romain Jouan	(Egypt) Sherif Sabry (Bosnia and Herzegovina) Tomislav Brkić (Croatia) Mate Delić (Belgium) Julien Dubail
December 10	Turkey F48 Futures; Antalya-Kaya Belek, Turkey; Hard $10,000; Singles draw - Doubles draw	(Moldova) Andrei Ciumac (Ukraine) Volodymyr Uzhylovskyi; 6–2, 4–6, [10–7]	(Italy) Lorenzo Giustino (Spain) Guillermo Olaso	(Germany) Matthias Wunner (France) Romain Jouan	(Egypt) Sherif Sabry (Bosnia and Herzegovina) Tomislav Brkić (Croatia) Mate Delić (Belgium) Julien Dubail
December 17	Chile F16 Futures; Santiago, Chile; Clay $10,000; Singles draw - Doubles draw	(Chile) Jorge Aguilar; 6–4, 3–6, 6–3	(Chile) Hans Podlipnik-Castillo	(Chile) Juan Carlos Sáez (Chile) Cristóbal Saavedra-Corvalán	(Chile) Felipe Ríos (Brazil) Wilson Leite (Argentina) Andrés Molteni (Argentina) Guillermo Durán
December 17	Chile F16 Futures; Santiago, Chile; Clay $10,000; Singles draw - Doubles draw	(Chile) Jorge Montero (Chile) Felipe Ríos; 3–6, 7–5, [10–7]	(Chile) Jorge Aguilar (Chile) Juan Carlos Sáez	(Chile) Juan Carlos Sáez (Chile) Cristóbal Saavedra-Corvalán	(Chile) Felipe Ríos (Brazil) Wilson Leite (Argentina) Andrés Molteni (Argentina) Guillermo Durán
December 17	Hong Kong F3 Futures; Hong Kong, Hong Kong; Hard $10,000; Singles draw - Doubles draw	(Netherlands) Miliaan Niesten; 6–2, 1–6, 6–4	(Australia) Alex Bolt	(South Korea) Nam Ji-sung (South Korea) Chung Hyeon	(Chinese Taipei) Huang Liang-chi (Poland) Piotr Gadomski (China) Li Zhe (China) Change Yu
December 17	Hong Kong F3 Futures; Hong Kong, Hong Kong; Hard $10,000; Singles draw - Doubles draw	(United States) Sekou Bangoura (United States) Daniel Nguyen; 6–4, 6–2	(New Zealand) Marcus Daniell (Australia) Kaden Hensel	(South Korea) Nam Ji-sung (South Korea) Chung Hyeon	(Chinese Taipei) Huang Liang-chi (Poland) Piotr Gadomski (China) Li Zhe (China) Change Yu
December 17	India F17 Futures; Belgaum, India; Hard $10,000; Singles draw - Doubles draw	(United States) Michael Shabaz; 6–0, 7–6^{(7–3)}	(Germany) Torsten Wietoska	(India) Sriram Balaji (Portugal) André Gaspar Murta	(Netherlands) Colin van Beem (Greece) Theodoros Angelinos (India) Ashwin Vijayragavan (Netherlands) Jeroen Benard
December 17	India F17 Futures; Belgaum, India; Hard $10,000; Singles draw - Doubles draw	(United States) Amrit Narasimhan (United States) Michael Shabaz; 7–6^{(7–3)}, 7–5	(India) Vijay Sundar Prashanth (India) Arun-Prakash Rajagopalan	(India) Sriram Balaji (Portugal) André Gaspar Murta	(Netherlands) Colin van Beem (Greece) Theodoros Angelinos (India) Ashwin Vijayragavan (Netherlands) Jeroen Benard
December 17	Turkey F49 Futures; Antalya-Kaya Belek, Turkey; Hard $10,000; Singles draw - Doubles draw	(Spain) Guillermo Olaso; 6–4, 6–4	(Egypt) Sherif Sabry	(Ukraine) Volodymyr Uzhylovskyi (Bulgaria) Dimitar Kuzmanov	(Belgium) Julien Dubail (France) Maxime Hamou (France) Quentin Halys (Moldova) Andrei Ciumac
December 17	Turkey F49 Futures; Antalya-Kaya Belek, Turkey; Hard $10,000; Singles draw - Doubles draw	The doubles event has been cancelled.		(Ukraine) Volodymyr Uzhylovskyi (Bulgaria) Dimitar Kuzmanov	(Belgium) Julien Dubail (France) Maxime Hamou (France) Quentin Halys (Moldova) Andrei Ciumac
December 24	Turkey F50 Futures; Istanbul, Turkey; Hard $10,000; Singles draw - Doubles draw	(Russia) Valery Rudnev; 6–4, 6–3	(Italy) Lorenzo Frigerio	(Bulgaria) Tihomir Grozdanov (Russia) Andrei Plotniy	(Ukraine) Vladyslav Manafov (Bulgaria) Dimitar Kuzmanov (Russia) Maxim Lunkin (Austria) Daniel Geib
December 24	Turkey F50 Futures; Istanbul, Turkey; Hard $10,000; Singles draw - Doubles draw	(Russia) Alexandre Krasnoroutskiy (Russia) Anton Manegin; 7–6^{(7–2)}, 6–3	(Bulgaria) Tihomir Grozdanov (Bulgaria) Dinko Halachev	(Bulgaria) Tihomir Grozdanov (Russia) Andrei Plotniy	(Ukraine) Vladyslav Manafov (Bulgaria) Dimitar Kuzmanov (Russia) Maxim Lunkin (Austria) Daniel Geib

== See also ==
- 2012 ITF Men's Circuit
- 2012 ITF Men's Circuit (January–March)
- 2012 ITF Men's Circuit (April–June)
- 2012 ITF Men's Circuit (July–September)
- 2012 ATP World Tour
- 2012 ATP Challenger Tour
