= 2012 ITF Men's Circuit =

2012 men's professional tennis circuit

Details
- Duration: 2 January – 30 December 2012
- Edition: 15th
- Tournaments: 582
- Categories: $15,000 tournaments (168) $10,000 tournaments (414)

Achievements (singles)
- Most titles: (Bosnia and Herzegovina) Aldin Šetkić (7)

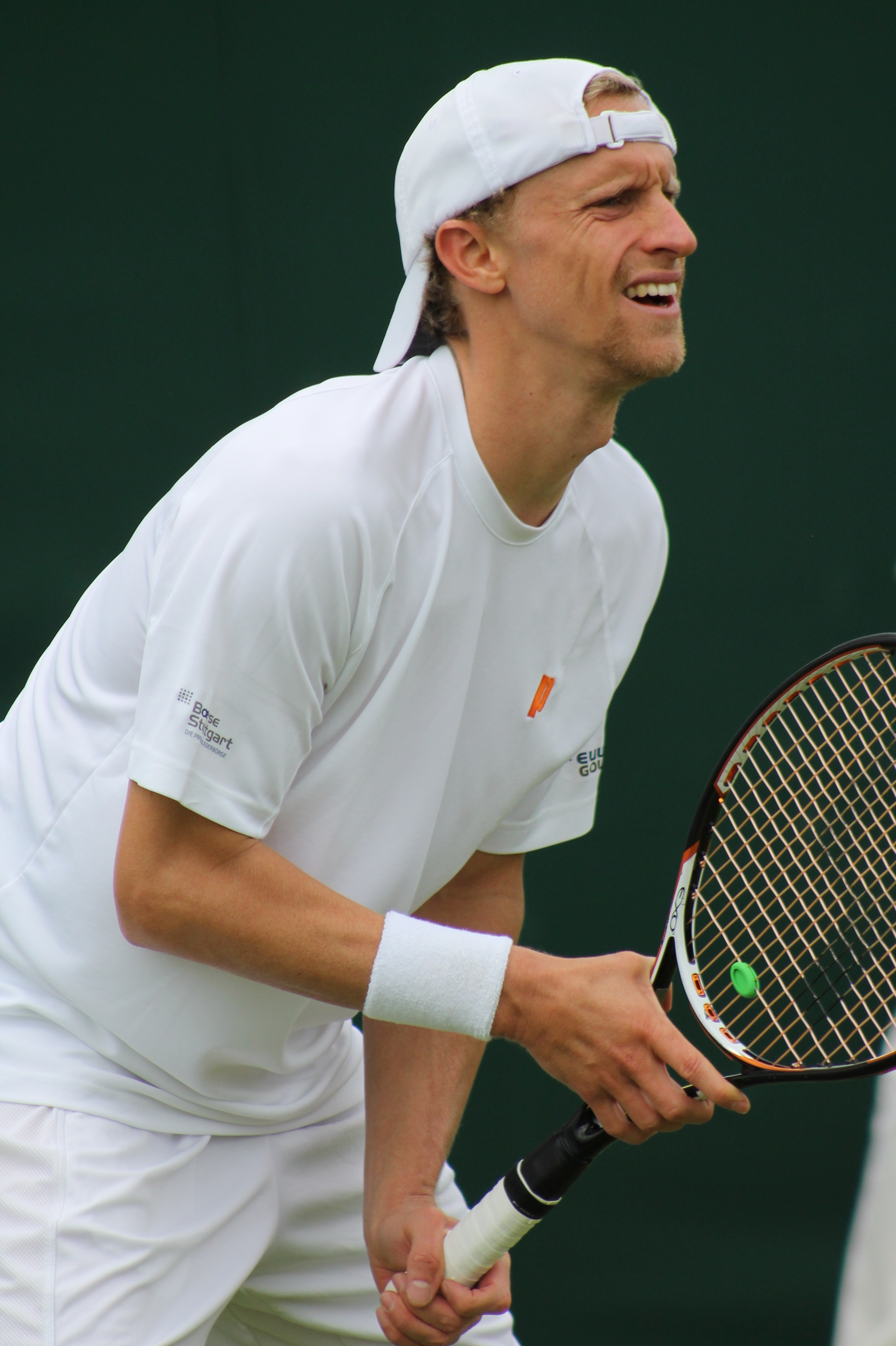
Bastian Knittel won six titles on the ITF Men's Circuit in 2012.

The 2012 ITF Men's Circuit is the 2012 edition of the entry level tour for men's professional tennis, and is the third tier tennis tour below the Association of Tennis Professionals, World Tour and Challenger Tour. It is organised by the International Tennis Federation (ITF) who additionally organizes the ITF Women's Circuit which is an entry-level tour for women's professional tennis. Future tournaments are organized to offer either $10,000 or $15,000 in prize money and tournaments which offering hospitality to players competing in the main draw give additional ranking points which are valid under the ATP ranking system, and are to be organized by a national association or approved by the ITF Men's Circuit Committee.

The tournaments are played on a rectangular flat surface, commonly referred to as a tennis court. The dimensions of a tennis court are defined and regulated by the ITF and the court is 23.78 meters (78.0 feet) long, 10.97 meters (36.0 feet) wide. Its width is 8.23 meters (27.0 feet) for singles matches and 10.97 meters (36.0 feet) for doubles matches. Tennis is played on a variety of surfaces and each surface has its own characteristics which affect the playing style of the game. There are four main types of courts depending on the materials used for the court surface, clay, hard, grass and carpet courts with the ITF classifying five different pace settings ranging from slow to fast.

== Participating host nations ==
- Algeria (ALG)
- Argentina (ARG)
- Armenia (ARM)
- Australia (AUS)
- Austria (AUT)
- Bahrain (BHR)
- Belgium (BEL)
- Bolivia (BOL)
- Bosnia and Herzegovina (BIH)
- Brazil (BRA)
- Bulgaria (BUL)
- Burundi (BDI)
- Cambodia (CAM)
- Canada (CAN)
- Chile (CHI)
- China (CHN)
- Chinese Taipei (TPE)
- Colombia (COL)
- Croatia (CRO)
- Czech Republic (CZE)
- Ecuador (ECU)
- Egypt (EGY)
- Estonia (EST)
- Finland (FIN)
- France (FRA)
- Georgia (GEO)
- Germany (GER)
- Great Britain (GBR)
- Greece (GRE)
- Guatemala (GUA)
- Hong Kong (HKG)
- India (IND)
- Indonesia (IDN)
- Iran (IRN)
- Israel (ISR)
- Italy (ITA)
- Japan (JPN)
- Kazakhstan (KAZ)
- Kuwait (KUW)
- Latvia (LAT)
- Liechtenstein (LIE) (Note: The second Switzerland tournament was held in Vaduz, Liechtenstein.)
- Lithuania (LTU)
- Mexico (MEX)
- Morocco (MAR)
- Netherlands (NED)
- Nigeria (NGA)
- Panama (PAN)
- Poland (POL)
- Portugal (POR)
- Qatar (QAT)
- Ireland (IRL)
- Romania (ROU)
- Russia (RUS)
- Rwanda (RWA)
- Saudi Arabia (SAU)
- Serbia (SRB)
- Slovakia (SVK)
- Slovenia (SLO)
- South Africa (RSA)
- South Korea (KOR)
- Spain (ESP)
- Sweden (SWE)
- Switzerland (SUI)
- Thailand (THA)
- Turkey (TUR)
- Ukraine (UKR)
- United Arab Emirates (UAE)
- United States (USA)
- Uzbekistan (UZB)
- Venezuela (VEN)
- Vietnam (VIE)
- Zimbabwe (ZIM)

Countries that are hosting a tournament in 2012, but did not in 2011.

- Bahrain (BHR)
- Egypt (EGY)
- Georgia (GEO)
- Greece (GRE)
- Hong Kong (HKG)
- Qatar (QAT)
- Saudi Arabia (SAU)
- Slovenia (SLO)
- United Arab Emirates (UAE)
- Vietnam (VIE)
- Zimbabwe (ZIM)

== Schedule ==
=== Key ===
$15,000 tournaments
$10,000 tournaments

=== January–March ===
No.	January					February				March			
No.	2	9	16	23	30	6	13	20	27	5	12	19	26
1	CHN F1	CHN F2	FRA F1	EGY F1	EGY F2	CHN F3	AUS F1	AUS F2	ARG F1	ARG F2	ARG F3	ARG F4	ARG F5
2		GER F1	GER F2	FRA F2	FRA F3	GUA F1	BRA F7	BRA F8	CHI F4	CAN F1	CAN F2	AUS F3	AUS F4
3		GBR F1	GBR F2	GER F3	GER F4	ESP F1	CHI F1	CHI F2	IND F2	FRA F4	CRO F3	CRO F4	BHR F1
4		ISR F1	ISR F2	GBR F3	MEX F2	TUR F5	CHN F4	CRO F2	POR F1	GBR F4	FRA F5	FRA F6	CRO F5
5		RUS F1	RUS F2	ISR F3	TUR F4		CRO F1	IND F1	ESP F4	IND F3	GBR F5	ISR F5	ISR F6
6		TUR F1	TUR F2	MEX F1	USA F4		PAN F1	RUS F5	TUR F8	POR F2	ISR F4	ISR F1	ITA F2
7		USA F1	USA F2	RUS F3			RUS F4	ESP F3	UKR F2	ESP F5	JPN F1	JPN F2	JPN F3
8				TUR F3			ESP F2	TUR F7	USA F6	TUR F9	POR F3	RUS F7	KAZ F1
9				USA F3			TUR F6	UKR F1		UKR F3	RUS F6	SUI F2	SUI F3
10								USA F5			ESP F6	TUR F11	TUR F12
11											SUI F1	UAE F1	
12											TUR F10	USA F8	
13											USA F7		

=== April–June ===
No.	April					May				June			
No.	2	9	16	23	30	7	14	21	28	4	11	18	25
1	ARG F6	CHN F5	ARG F7	ARG F8	ARG F9	BIH F2	BIH F3	BIH F4	BIH F5	ARG F11	ARG F12	ARG F14	ARG F15
2	CRO F6	TPE F1	CHN F6	FRA F9	BIH F1	BRA F9	BRA F10	BRA F11	BRA F12	CHI F7	BRA F13	BRA F14	BEL F1
3	GRE F1	FRA F7	TPE F2	GBR F6	GBR F7	BUL F1	BUL F2	BUL F3	CHI F6	IND F8	GER F5	CHN F9	BRA F15
4	ITA F3	GRE F2	FRA F6	IND F5	IND F6	CZE F1	CHN F7	CHI F5	IND F7	ITA F12	IND F9	FRA F10	CHN F10
5	JPN F4	ITA F4	GRE F3	ITA F6	ISR F7	GBR F8	CZE F2	CHN F3	ITA F11	MAR F3	ITA F13	GER F6	FRA F11
6	KAZ F2	KAZ F3	IND F4	MEX F4	ITA F7	ISR F8	ISR F9	CZE F3	KOR F3	PER F3	JPN F5	ITA F14	GER F7
7	SAU F1	QAT F1	ITA F5	ESP F9	MEX F5	ITA F8	ITA F9	KOR F2	MAR F2	POL F3	NED F1	JPN F6	IDN F1
8	TUR F13	TUR F14	MEX F3	TUR F16	ESP F10	MEX F6	KOR F1	MEX F8	PER F2	SLO F2	PER F4	NED F2	ITA F15
9	VIE F1	USA F9	ESP F8	UZB F2	SWE F1	ESP F11	MEX F7	MAR F1	POL F2	ESP F15	SRB F1	PER F5	JPN F7
10		VIE F2	TUR F15		TUR F17	SWE F2	ROU F1	PER F1	ROU F3	TUR F22	SLO F3	RUS F8	NED F3
11			USA F10		USA F11	THA F1	ESP F12	POL F1	SLO F1	USA F14	ESP F16	SRB F2	PER F6
12			UZB F1			TUR F18	SWE F3	ROU F13	ESP F14		TUR F23	ESP F17	ROU F4
13			VIE F3			USA F12	THA F2	ESP F13	TUR F21		USA F15	TUR F24	RUS F9
14						VEN F1	TUR F19	THA F3				USA F16	SRB F3
15							USA F13	TUR F20					ESP F18
16							VEN F2	VEN F3					TUR F25
17													USA F17

=== July–September ===
No.	July					August				September			
No.	2	9	16	23	30	6	13	20	27	3	10	17	24
1	ARG F16	ARG F17	ARG F18	AUT F3	AUT F4	ARG F19	ARG F20	ARG F21	ARG F22	ARG F23	ARG F24	AUS F8	BOL F3
2	ARM F1	ARM F2	AUT F2	BEL F5	BEL F6	AUT F5	AUT F6	AUT F7	AUS F5	AUS F6	AUS F7	BOL F2	BRA F27
3	BEL F2	AUT F1	BEL F4	BRA F18	BRA F19	BEL F7	BEL F8	BEL F9	AUT F8	AUT F9	BOL F1	BRA F26	COL F3
4	BRA F16	BEL F3	CZE F5	CZE F6	GER F12	BRA F20	BRA F21	BRA F22	BEL F10	BRA F24	CAN F8	CAN F9	FRA F18
5	CAN F3	CAN F4	EST F1	EST F2	GBR F12	FIN F1	CAN F5	CAN F6	BRA F23	CAN F7	FRA F16	FRA F17	GER F17
6	FRA F12	CZE F4	FRA F14	GER F11	IND F12	GER F13	COL F1	COL F2	CRO F9	FRA F15	GEO F2	ITA F27	ITA F28
7	GER F8	FRA F13	GER F10	IND F11	ITA F20	GBR F13	CRO F7	CRO F8	ECU F3	GEO F1	GBR F16	KUW F1	KUW F2
8	GBR F9	GER F9	GBR F11	IRL F1	LTU F1	LAT F1	ECU F1	ECU F2	GER F16	GBR F15	ITA F26	MEX F11	POR F5
9	IDN F2	GBR F10	IND F10	ITA F19	RUS F10	RUS F11	FIN F2	FIN F3	GBR F14	IRN F2	MEX F10	POR F4	SRB F14
10	ITA F16	ITA F17	ITA F18	SRB F6	SRB F7	SRB F8	GER F14	GER F15	IRN F1	ITA F25	SRB F12	SRB F13	ESP F30
11	NED F4	KAZ F6	KAZ F7	ESP F21	SVK F1	SVK F2	ITA F22	ITA F23	ITA F24	MEX F9	ESP F28	ESP F29	SWE F6
12	ROU F5	ROU F6	ESP F20	TUR F29	ESP F22	TUR F31	POL F4	NED F5	NED F6	NED F7	SWE F4	SWE F5	TUR F37
13	SRB F4	SRB F5	TUR F28	USA F21	TUR F30	USA F23	ROU F7	POL F5	POL F6	SRB F11	TUR F35	TUR F36	USA F26
14	ESP F19	TUR F27	USA F20		USA F22		RUS F12	ROU F8	ROU F9	ESP F27	USA F24	USA F25	VIE F6
15	TUR F26	USA F19					SRB F9	RUS F13	RUS F14	TUR F34	VIE F4	VIE F5	
16	USA F18						SVK F3	SRB F10	ESP F26				
17							ESP F24	ESP F24					
18							TUR F32	TUR F33					

=== October–December ===
No.	October					November				December			
No.	1	8	16	23	30	5	12	19	26	3	10	17	24
1	AUS F9	ALG F1	ALG F2	ALG F3	AUS F12	BRA F33	BRA F30	ARG F26	ARG F27	ARG F28	CHI F15	CHI F16	TUR F50
2	BOL F4	BOL F5	CHI F9	AUS F11	BRA F32	CZE F8	BDI F1	BRA F34	BRA F35	BRA F36	HKG F2	HKG F3	
3	BRA F28	CHI F8	CHI F9	BRA F31	CHI F11	GRE F6	CZE F9	CAM F1	CAM F2	CAM F3	IND F16	IND F17	
4	COL F4	CRO F10	CRO F11	CHI F10	CZE F7	MEX F13	GRE F7	CHI F12	CHI F13	CHI F14	RSA F2	TUR F49	
5	FRA F19	FRA F20	FRA F21	CRO F12	GRE F5	THA F5	MEX F14	MEX F15	IDN F3	HKG F1	TUR F48		
6	GER F18	GER F19	GER F20	FRA F22	IND F14	TUR F43	THA F6	MAR F9	MAR F10	IND F15			
7	KUW F3	JPN F8	GBR F17	GBR F18	ISR F12	USA F31	TUR F44	RWA F1	RWA F2	IDN F4			
8	QAT F2	QAT F3	ISR F10	GRE F4	MEX F12		USA F32	TUR F45	TUR F46	RSA F1			
9	ESP F32	TUR F39	JPN F9	IND F13	THA F4				ZIM F1	TUR F47			
10	SWE F7	USA F27	KAZ F8	ISR F11	TUR F42								
11	TUR F28		MAR F6	KAZ F9	USA F30								
12			NGA F1	MAR F7	VEN F5								
13			QAT F4	NGA F2									
14			USA F28	TUR F41									
15			TUR F40	USA F29									
16				VEN F4									

== Point distribution ==
Tournament Category	W	F	SF	QF	R16	R32
Futures 15,000+H	35	20	10	4	1	0
Futures 15,000	27	15	8	3	1	0
Futures 10,000+H	27	15	8	3	1	0
Futures 10,000	18	10	6	2	1	0
