= Ryan Thacher =

American tennis player

- Country (sports): United States
- Born: 6 October 1989 (age 36) Los Angeles, United States
- Plays: Left-handed
- Prize money: $10,487

Singles
- Career record: 0–0 (at ATP Tour level, Grand Slam level, and in Davis Cup)
- Career titles: 0 ITF
- Highest ranking: No. 974 (25 February 2013)

Doubles
- Career record: 1–2 (at ATP Tour level, Grand Slam level, and in Davis Cup)
- Career titles: 4 ITF
- Highest ranking: No. 528 (22 July 2013)
- Last updated on: 31 January 2020.

Ryan Thacher (born 6 October 1989) is an American tennis player. Thacher played in his first national tennis tournament when he was 14.

Thacher has a career high ATP singles ranking of 974 achieved on 25 February 2013. He also has a career high ATP doubles ranking of 528 achieved on 22 July 2013.

Thacher made his ATP main draw debut at the 2007 Countrywide Classic in the doubles draw partnering Zack Fleishman.
