= 2009 Abierto Internacional de Salinas =

- Date: January 12 – January 18
- Edition: 14
- Location: Salinas, Ecuador

Champions

Singles
- (Colombia) Santiago Giraldo

Doubles
- (Thailand) Sonchat Ratiwatana / (Thailand) Sanchai Ratiwatana
- Abierto Internacional de Salinas

The 2009 Challenger Salinas Diario Expreso, also known as 2009 Abierto Internacional de Salinas, was a professional tennis tournament played on outdoor hard courts. It was part of the 2009 ATP Challenger Tour. It took place in Salinas, Ecuador between January 12 and January 18, 2009.

== Singles main-draw entrants ==
=== Seeds ===
Country	Player	Rank^{1}	Seed
ARG	Leonardo Mayer	113	1
BRA	Thiago Alves	126	2
GER	Benjamin Becker	135	3
URU	Pablo Cuevas	141	4
DEN	Kristian Pless	156	5
COL	Santiago Giraldo	160	6
BRA	Ricardo Hocevar	166	7
ARG	Juan Pablo Brzezicki	175	8

- Rankings are as of January 5, 2009.

=== Other entrants ===
The following players received wildcards into the singles main draw:

- (Argentina) Alejo Apud
- (Ecuador) Carlos Avellán
- (Ecuador) Júlio César Campozano
- (United States) Eric Nunez

The following players received entry from the qualifying draw:

- (Argentina) Máximo González
- (Colombia) Carlos Salamanca
- (Brazil) Daniel Silva
- (South Africa) Izak van der Merwe

== Champions ==
=== Men's singles ===
(Colombia) Santiago Giraldo def. (United States) Michael Russell, 6–3, 6–2

=== Men's doubles ===
(Thailand) Sanchai Ratiwatana / (Thailand) Sonchat Ratiwatana def. (Argentina) Juan Pablo Brzezicki / (Peru) Iván Miranda, 6–3, 7–6(4)
