= 2011 ITF Men's Circuit (April–June) =

The 2011 ITF Men's Circuit is the 2011 edition of the third-tier tour for men's professional tennis. It is organised by the International Tennis Federation and is a tier below the ATP Challenger Tour. During the months of April 2011 and June 2011 over 150 tournaments were played with the majority being played in the month of May.

== Key ==
$15,000 tournaments
$10,000 tournaments

== April ==
Week of	Tournament	Winner	Runners-up	Semifinalists	Quarterfinalists
April 4	Australia F4 Futures; Bundaberg, Australia; Clay $15,000	(Australia) James Lemke; 6–2, 6–4	(Canada) Érik Chvojka	(Australia) Benjamin Mitchell (New Zealand) Michael Venus	(Australia) Dane Propoggia (Australia) Michael Look (New Zealand) Rubin José Statham (Australia) Matt Reid
April 4	Australia F4 Futures; Bundaberg, Australia; Clay $15,000	(Australia) Matt Reid (New Zealand) Michael Venus; 2–6, 6–2, [10–4]	(Canada) Érik Chvojka (New Zealand) Rubin José Statham	(Australia) Benjamin Mitchell (New Zealand) Michael Venus	(Australia) Dane Propoggia (Australia) Michael Look (New Zealand) Rubin José Statham (Australia) Matt Reid
April 4	Chile F2 Futures; Santiago, Chile; Clay $10,000	(France) Guillaume Rufin; 6–2, 6–2	(Peru) Duilio Beretta	(Argentina) Guido Andreozzi (Italy) Stefano Travaglia	(France) Axel Michon (Argentina) Diego Schwartzman (Chile) Guillermo Hormazábal (Chile) Cristóbal Saavedra Corvalán
April 4	Chile F2 Futures; Santiago, Chile; Clay $10,000	(Peru) Duilio Beretta (Peru) Sergio Galdós; 5–7, 7–6^{(7–5)}, [10–5]	(Chile) Guillermo Hormazábal (Chile) Rodrigo Pérez	(Argentina) Guido Andreozzi (Italy) Stefano Travaglia	(France) Axel Michon (Argentina) Diego Schwartzman (Chile) Guillermo Hormazábal (Chile) Cristóbal Saavedra Corvalán
April 4	Croatia F5 Futures; Vrsar, Croatia; Clay $10,000	(Germany) Marc Sieber; 6–2, 6–4	(Croatia) Kristijan Mesaroš	(Slovakia) Kamil Čapkovič (Croatia) Antonio Lupieri	(Germany) Kevin Krawietz (Croatia) Joško Topić (Slovakia) Norbert Gombos (Romania) Victor Anagnastopol
April 4	Croatia F5 Futures; Vrsar, Croatia; Clay $10,000	(Croatia) Toni Androić (Croatia) Dino Marcan; 4–6, 6–3, [10–5]	(Slovakia) Kamil Čapkovič (Slovakia) Michal Pažický	(Slovakia) Kamil Čapkovič (Croatia) Antonio Lupieri	(Germany) Kevin Krawietz (Croatia) Joško Topić (Slovakia) Norbert Gombos (Romania) Victor Anagnastopol
April 4	Italy F4 Futures; Rome, Italy; Clay $15,000	(Italy) Daniele Giorgini; 7–5, 6–1	(Italy) Alessandro Giannessi	(Italy) Matteo Trevisan (Italy) Filippo Leonardi	(Italy) Stefano Galvani (Serbia) Dušan Lajović (France) Baptiste Dupuy (Russia) Mikhail Vasiliev
April 4	Italy F4 Futures; Rome, Italy; Clay $15,000	(Argentina) Leandro Migani (Sweden) Filip Prpic; 6–3, 3–6, [10–6]	(Italy) Francesco Aldi (Italy) Marco Cecchinato	(Italy) Matteo Trevisan (Italy) Filippo Leonardi	(Italy) Stefano Galvani (Serbia) Dušan Lajović (France) Baptiste Dupuy (Russia) Mikhail Vasiliev
April 4	Spain F11 Futures; Madrid, Spain; Clay $10,000	(United Kingdom) Morgan Phillips; 1–6, 6–1, 6–4	(Italy) Matteo Marrai	(France) Laurent Rochette (Japan) Taro Daniel	(Spain) Carlos Gómez-Herrera (Spain) Íñigo Cervantes Huegun (Germany) Yannick Hanfmann (France) Mathieu Rodrigues
April 4	Spain F11 Futures; Madrid, Spain; Clay $10,000	(Spain) Guillermo Alcaide (Russia) Nikolai Nesterov; 6–4, 6–4	(Spain) Carles Poch Gradin (Netherlands) Mark Vervoort	(France) Laurent Rochette (Japan) Taro Daniel	(Spain) Carlos Gómez-Herrera (Spain) Íñigo Cervantes Huegun (Germany) Yannick Hanfmann (France) Mathieu Rodrigues
April 4	Thailand F2 Futures; Khon Kaen, Thailand; Hard $10,000	(Thailand) Danai Udomchoke; 6–2, 6–4	(United Kingdom) Daniel Evans	(South Korea) Kim Young-jun (Republic of Ireland) Sam Barry	(United Kingdom) Alexander Ward (Japan) Hiroki Moriya (India) Rohan Gajjar (France) Simon Cauvard
April 4	Thailand F2 Futures; Khon Kaen, Thailand; Hard $10,000	(Thailand) Weerapat Doakmaiklee (Thailand) Kittipong Wachiramanowong; 7–6^{(11–9)}, 6–2	(Chinese Taipei) Lee Hsin-han (Japan) Bumpei Sato	(South Korea) Kim Young-jun (Republic of Ireland) Sam Barry	(United Kingdom) Alexander Ward (Japan) Hiroki Moriya (India) Rohan Gajjar (France) Simon Cauvard
April 4	Turkey F12 Futures; Antalya, Turkey; Hard $10,000	(Moldova) Radu Albot; 6–3, 6–1	(Belgium) Yannik Reuter	(Slovakia) Filip Horanský (Slovakia) Miloslav Mečíř Jr.	(Switzerland) Yann Marti (United Kingdom) David Rice (Russia) Ivan Nedelko (Germany) Peter Gojowczyk
April 4	Turkey F12 Futures; Antalya, Turkey; Hard $10,000	(Serbia) Nikola Ćaćić (Slovakia) Jozef Kovalík; 4–6, 6–4, [10–4]	(United Kingdom) David Rice (United Kingdom) Sean Thornley	(Slovakia) Filip Horanský (Slovakia) Miloslav Mečíř Jr.	(Switzerland) Yann Marti (United Kingdom) David Rice (Russia) Ivan Nedelko (Germany) Peter Gojowczyk
April 4	USA F9 Futures; Little Rock, USA; Hard $15,000	(Spain) Arnau Brugués Davi; 6–3, 6–1	(United Kingdom) Alex Bogdanovic	(United Kingdom) Jamie Baker (Australia) Chris Guccione	(United States) Nicholas Monroe (Canada) Vasek Pospisil (Bulgaria) Dimitar Kutrovsky (Chinese Taipei) Jimmy Wang
April 4	USA F9 Futures; Little Rock, USA; Hard $15,000	(Australia) Nima Roshan (New Zealand) Artem Sitak; 6–3, 7–5	(United States) Taylor Fogleman (United States) Benjamin Rogers	(United Kingdom) Jamie Baker (Australia) Chris Guccione	(United States) Nicholas Monroe (Canada) Vasek Pospisil (Bulgaria) Dimitar Kutrovsky (Chinese Taipei) Jimmy Wang
April 11	Argentina F1 Futures; Arroyito, Argentina; Clay $10,000	(Argentina) Agustín Velotti; 6–2, 6–3	(Argentina) Diego Schwartzman	(Argentina) Guillermo Durán (Argentina) Guido Andreozzi	(Argentina) Juan-Pablo Amado (Argentina) Gabriel Hidalgo (Uruguay) Martín Cuevas (Argentina) Lionel Noviski
April 11	Argentina F1 Futures; Arroyito, Argentina; Clay $10,000	(Argentina) Diego Schwartzman (Argentina) Agustín Velotti; 6–4, 7–5	(Argentina) Andrés Ceppo (Argentina) Agustín Picco	(Argentina) Guillermo Durán (Argentina) Guido Andreozzi	(Argentina) Juan-Pablo Amado (Argentina) Gabriel Hidalgo (Uruguay) Martín Cuevas (Argentina) Lionel Noviski
April 11	Brazil F9 Futures; Santa Maria, Brazil; Clay $10,000	(Brazil) Rodrigo Guidolin; 6–1, 6–4	(Argentina) Gastón-Arturo Grimolizzi	(Brazil) Guilherme Clézar (Canada) Steven Diez	(Brazil) Fabiano de Paula (Czech Republic) Roman Vögeli (Argentina) Benjamin Tenti (Paraguay) Daniel-Alejandro López
April 11	Brazil F9 Futures; Santa Maria, Brazil; Clay $10,000	(Canada) Steven Diez (Czech Republic) Roman Vögeli; 7–6^{(7–5)}, 6–3	(Paraguay) Daniel-Alejandro López (Argentina) Martín Ríos Benítez	(Brazil) Guilherme Clézar (Canada) Steven Diez	(Brazil) Fabiano de Paula (Czech Republic) Roman Vögeli (Argentina) Benjamin Tenti (Paraguay) Daniel-Alejandro López
April 11	Chile F3 Futures; Santiago, Chile; Clay $10,000	(France) Guillaume Rufin; 6–4, 6–2	(Chile) Guillermo Hormazábal	(Chile) Cristóbal Saavedra Corvalán (Peru) Mauricio Echazú	(Brazil) Ricardo Siggia (Argentina) Diego Álvarez (France) Axel Michon (Uruguay) Marcel Felder
April 11	Chile F3 Futures; Santiago, Chile; Clay $10,000	(Peru) Duilio Beretta (Ecuador) Roberto Quiroz; 6–4, 7–5	(Venezuela) Luis David Martínez (Mexico) Miguel Ángel Reyes-Varela	(Chile) Cristóbal Saavedra Corvalán (Peru) Mauricio Echazú	(Brazil) Ricardo Siggia (Argentina) Diego Álvarez (France) Axel Michon (Uruguay) Marcel Felder
April 11	China F3 Futures; Chengdu, China; Hard $15,000	(Chinese Taipei) Chen Ti; 3–6, 6–1, 6–4	(South Korea) Lim Yong-kyu	(United Kingdom) Daniel Evans (Hungary) Márton Fucsovics	(Finland) Harri Heliövaara (China) Wu Di (France) Fabrice Martin (China) Zhang Ze
April 11	China F3 Futures; Chengdu, China; Hard $15,000	(China) Gong Maoxin (China) Li Zhe; 6–0, 6–3	(Chinese Taipei) Chen Ti (China) Xu Junchao	(United Kingdom) Daniel Evans (Hungary) Márton Fucsovics	(Finland) Harri Heliövaara (China) Wu Di (France) Fabrice Martin (China) Zhang Ze
April 11	France F6 Futures; Angers, France; Clay (indoor) $15,000+H	(France) Charles-Antoine Brézac; 6–2, 7–5	(France) Kenny de Schepper	(France) Romain Jouan (France) Mathieu Rodrigues	(France) Tak Khunn Wang (France) Médy Chettar (Spain) Sergio Gutiérrez Ferrol (France) Jonathan Dasnières de Veigy
April 11	France F6 Futures; Angers, France; Clay (indoor) $15,000+H	(France) Grégoire Burquier (France) Romain Jouan; 6–3, 6–2	(Republic of Ireland) Daniel Glancy (New Zealand) Sebastian Lavie	(France) Romain Jouan (France) Mathieu Rodrigues	(France) Tak Khunn Wang (France) Médy Chettar (Spain) Sergio Gutiérrez Ferrol (France) Jonathan Dasnières de Veigy
April 11	India F3 Futures; Chandigarh, India; Hard $10,000	(India) Vishnu Vardhan; 4–6, 7–5, 6–3	(India) Yuki Bhambri	(Belgium) Julien Dubail (Spain) Marc Fornell Mestres	(Uzbekistan) Murad Inoyatov (Chinese Taipei) Lee Hsin-han (India) Ashutosh Singh (India) Rohan Gajjar
April 11	India F3 Futures; Chandigarh, India; Hard $10,000	(India) Divij Sharan (India) Vishnu Vardhan; 6–4, 4–6, [10–7]	(Chinese Taipei) Lee Hsin-han (Japan) Bumpei Sato	(Belgium) Julien Dubail (Spain) Marc Fornell Mestres	(Uzbekistan) Murad Inoyatov (Chinese Taipei) Lee Hsin-han (India) Ashutosh Singh (India) Rohan Gajjar
April 11	Italy F5 Futures; Vercelli, Italy; Clay $15,000	(Italy) Stefano Galvani; 7–6^{(8–6)}, 6–0	(Germany) Jan-Lennard Struff	(Italy) Alberto Brizzi (Austria) Daniel Köllerer	(Australia) John Millman (Italy) Daniele Giorgini (Morocco) Anas Fattar (Latvia) Andis Juška
April 11	Italy F5 Futures; Vercelli, Italy; Clay $15,000	(Italy) Erik Crepaldi (Croatia) Ante Pavić; 7–6^{(7–4)}, 6–7^{(4–7)}, [10–5]	(Austria) Philipp Oswald (Austria) Bertram Steinberger	(Italy) Alberto Brizzi (Austria) Daniel Köllerer	(Australia) John Millman (Italy) Daniele Giorgini (Morocco) Anas Fattar (Latvia) Andis Juška
April 11	Spain F12 Futures; Madrid, Spain; Clay $10,000	(Spain) Roberto Carballés; 6–3, 7–6^{(7–4)}	(Spain) Gabriel Trujillo Soler	(Hungary) Ádám Kellner (Spain) Pablo Martín-Adalia	(Bolivia) Federico Zeballos (Belgium) Alexandre Folie (Spain) David Estruch (United Kingdom) Alexander Slabinsky
April 11	Spain F12 Futures; Madrid, Spain; Clay $10,000	(Spain) Miguel Ángel López Jaén (Spain) Carles Poch Gradin; 4–6, 7–6^{(7–2)}, [17–15]	(Australia) Allen Perel (Spain) Gabriel Trujillo Soler	(Hungary) Ádám Kellner (Spain) Pablo Martín-Adalia	(Bolivia) Federico Zeballos (Belgium) Alexandre Folie (Spain) David Estruch (United Kingdom) Alexander Slabinsky
April 11	Thailand F3 Futures; Khon Kaen, Thailand; Hard $10,000	(South Korea) Kim Young-jun; 7–6^{(7–3)}, 6–2	(Germany) Jaan-Frederik Brunken	(United Kingdom) Joshua Milton (United Kingdom) Alexander Ward	(South Korea) An Jae-sung (Thailand) Kittipong Wachiramanowong (South Korea) Cho Soong-jae (Japan) Hiroki Moriya
April 11	Thailand F3 Futures; Khon Kaen, Thailand; Hard $10,000	(Thailand) Weerapat Doakmaiklee (Thailand) Kittipong Wachiramanowong; 6–0, 6–2	(Indonesia) Christopher Rungkat (Thailand) Kirati Siributwong	(United Kingdom) Joshua Milton (United Kingdom) Alexander Ward	(South Korea) An Jae-sung (Thailand) Kittipong Wachiramanowong (South Korea) Cho Soong-jae (Japan) Hiroki Moriya
April 11	Turkey F13 Futures; Antalya, Turkey; Hard $10,000	(Moldova) Radu Albot; 6–3, 6–2	(Germany) Peter Gojowczyk	(Australia) Brydan Klein (Slovakia) Jozef Kovalík	(Belgium) Maxime Authom (Slovakia) Miloslav Mečíř Jr. (Belgium) Yannik Reuter (United Kingdom) Joshua Goodall
April 11	Turkey F13 Futures; Antalya, Turkey; Hard $10,000	(Belgium) Maxime Authom (Switzerland) Adrien Bossel; 7–5, 6–4	(United Kingdom) Lewis Burton (United Kingdom) Joshua Goodall	(Australia) Brydan Klein (Slovakia) Jozef Kovalík	(Belgium) Maxime Authom (Slovakia) Miloslav Mečíř Jr. (Belgium) Yannik Reuter (United Kingdom) Joshua Goodall
April 18	Argentina F2 Futures; Villa María, Argentina; Clay $10,000	(Argentina) Facundo Argüello; 6–2, 6–4	(Argentina) Nicolás Pastor	(Chile) Cristóbal Saavedra Corvalán (Argentina) Guido Pella	(Argentina) Valentín Florez (Argentina) Guido Andreozzi (Argentina) Lionel Noviski (Argentina) Juan-Pablo Amado
April 18	Argentina F2 Futures; Villa María, Argentina; Clay $10,000	(Argentina) Diego Álvarez (Chile) Cristóbal Saavedra Corvalán; 4–6, 7–5, [10–7]	(Argentina) Guillermo Durán (Argentina) Alejandro Kon	(Chile) Cristóbal Saavedra Corvalán (Argentina) Guido Pella	(Argentina) Valentín Florez (Argentina) Guido Andreozzi (Argentina) Lionel Noviski (Argentina) Juan-Pablo Amado
April 18	Brazil F10 Futures; Brasília, Brazil; Clay $10,000	(Brazil) Nicolás Santos; 4–6, 6–2, 6–1	(Brazil) Eládio Ribeiro Neto	(Czech Republic) Roman Vögeli (Brazil) Fabiano de Paula	(Argentina) Gastón-Arturo Grimolizzi (Bolivia) Mauricio Doria-Medina (Brazil) Bruno Semenzato (Brazil) Rodrigo Guidolin
April 18	Brazil F10 Futures; Brasília, Brazil; Clay $10,000	(Brazil) Rodrigo Guidolin (Brazil) Bruno Semenzato; 6–3, 7–5	(Brazil) Charles Costa (Brazil) Danilo Ferraz	(Czech Republic) Roman Vögeli (Brazil) Fabiano de Paula	(Argentina) Gastón-Arturo Grimolizzi (Bolivia) Mauricio Doria-Medina (Brazil) Bruno Semenzato (Brazil) Rodrigo Guidolin
April 18	China F4 Futures; Chengdu, China; Hard $15,000	(South Korea) Im Kyu-tae; 7–6^{(10–8)}, 6–1	(China) Li Zhe	(Finland) Harri Heliövaara (United Kingdom) Joshua Milton	(South Korea) Lim Yong-kyu (Japan) Hiroki Kondo (South Korea) Noh Sang-woo (China) Gong Maoxin
April 18	China F4 Futures; Chengdu, China; Hard $15,000	(China) Gong Maoxin (China) Li Zhe; 6–3, 7–6^{(7–4)}	(South Korea) Im Kyu-tae (Japan) Hiroki Kondo	(Finland) Harri Heliövaara (United Kingdom) Joshua Milton	(South Korea) Lim Yong-kyu (Japan) Hiroki Kondo (South Korea) Noh Sang-woo (China) Gong Maoxin
April 18	France F7 Futures; Grasse, France; Clay $15,000	(France) Jonathan Eysseric; 7–5, 6–7^{(6–8)}, 7–6^{(9–7)}	(France) Romain Jouan	(France) Jonathan Dasnières de Veigy (France) Laurent Recouderc	(France) Olivier Patience (France) Florian Reynet (Spain) Pedro Clar Rosselló (France) Grégoire Burquier
April 18	France F7 Futures; Grasse, France; Clay $15,000	(France) Pierre-Hugues Herbert (France) Nicolas Renavand; 6–3, 6–2	(Australia) Allen Perel (Spain) Gabriel Trujillo Soler	(France) Jonathan Dasnières de Veigy (France) Laurent Recouderc	(France) Olivier Patience (France) Florian Reynet (Spain) Pedro Clar Rosselló (France) Grégoire Burquier
April 18	India F4 Futures; Noida, India; Hard $10,000	(India) Vishnu Vardhan; 7–5, 3–6, 7–6^{(15–13)}	(South Korea) Kim Young-jun	(Thailand) Danai Udomchoke (India) Karan Rastogi	(India) Vijayant Malik (India) Ranjeet Virali-Murugesan (Chinese Taipei) Lee Hsin-han (Belgium) Julien Dubail
April 18	India F4 Futures; Noida, India; Hard $10,000	(Indonesia) Christopher Rungkat (Thailand) Kittipong Wachiramanowong; 6–7^{(1–7)}, 6–3, [10–6]	(Japan) Junn Mitsuhashi (Thailand) Danai Udomchoke	(Thailand) Danai Udomchoke (India) Karan Rastogi	(India) Vijayant Malik (India) Ranjeet Virali-Murugesan (Chinese Taipei) Lee Hsin-han (Belgium) Julien Dubail
April 18	Italy F6 Futures; Padova, Italy; Clay $15,000	(Austria) Daniel Köllerer; 7–5, 6–1	(Belgium) Yannick Mertens	(Colombia) Alejandro González (Italy) Walter Trusendi	(Bosnia and Herzegovina) Mirza Bašić (Italy) Federico Torresi (Austria) Nicolas Reissig (Romania) Răzvan Sabău
April 18	Italy F6 Futures; Padova, Italy; Clay $15,000	(Croatia) Toni Androić (Croatia) Dino Marcan; 6–4, 6–4	(Italy) Andrea Arnaboldi (Italy) Walter Trusendi	(Colombia) Alejandro González (Italy) Walter Trusendi	(Bosnia and Herzegovina) Mirza Bašić (Italy) Federico Torresi (Austria) Nicolas Reissig (Romania) Răzvan Sabău
April 18	Turkey F14 Futures; Antalya, Turkey; Hard $10,000	(Spain) Arnau Brugués Davi; 7–5, 6–2	(Slovakia) Jozef Kovalík	(Czech Republic) Michal Konečný (Czech Republic) Jiří Kosler	(Belgium) Yannik Reuter (Russia) Dmitri Sitak (Germany) Stefan Seifert (Chile) Hans Podlipnik Castillo
April 18	Turkey F14 Futures; Antalya, Turkey; Hard $10,000	(Turkey) Tuna Altuna (Australia) Brydan Klein; 6–4, 6–3	(Belarus) Aliaksandr Bury (Ukraine) Vladyslav Klymenko	(Czech Republic) Michal Konečný (Czech Republic) Jiří Kosler	(Belgium) Yannik Reuter (Russia) Dmitri Sitak (Germany) Stefan Seifert (Chile) Hans Podlipnik Castillo
April 25	Argentina F3 Futures; Bell Ville, Argentina; Clay $10,000	(Argentina) Andrés Molteni; 6–4, 6–4	(Italy) Stefano Travaglia	(Argentina) Nicolás Pastor (Argentina) Martín Alund	(Argentina) Alejandro Kon (Chile) Cristóbal Saavedra Corvalán (Argentina) Guillermo Durán (Argentina) Agustín Velotti
April 25	Argentina F3 Futures; Bell Ville, Argentina; Clay $10,000	(Argentina) Martín Alund (Argentina) Andrés Molteni; 6–4, 7–6^{(7–4)}	(Uruguay) Martín Cuevas (Argentina) Juan-Manuel Romanazzi	(Argentina) Nicolás Pastor (Argentina) Martín Alund	(Argentina) Alejandro Kon (Chile) Cristóbal Saavedra Corvalán (Argentina) Guillermo Durán (Argentina) Agustín Velotti
April 25	Brazil F11 Futures; Aracaju, Brazil; Hard $10,000	(Canada) Steven Diez; 6–1, 6–2	(Czech Republic) Roman Vögeli	(Brazil) Eladio Ribeiro Neto (Brazil) Nicolás Santos	(Paraguay) Daniel-Alejandro López (Brazil) Luiz-Guilherme Deneka (Brazil) Fabiano de Paula (Brazil) André Miele
April 25	Brazil F11 Futures; Aracaju, Brazil; Hard $10,000	(Canada) Steven Diez (Czech Republic) Roman Vögeli; 6–1, 7–6^{(7–0)}	(Bolivia) Mauricio Doria-Medina (Paraguay) Daniel-Alejandro López	(Brazil) Eladio Ribeiro Neto (Brazil) Nicolás Santos	(Paraguay) Daniel-Alejandro López (Brazil) Luiz-Guilherme Deneka (Brazil) Fabiano de Paula (Brazil) André Miele
April 25	Great Britain F5 Futures; Bournemouth, Great Britain; Clay $10,000	(Italy) Enrico Burzi; 7–6^{(7–2)}, 7–5	(Belgium) Arthur De Greef	(Italy) Federico Torresi (United Kingdom) Alexander Slabinsky	(France) Gleb Sakharov (Spain) Carles Poch Gradin (Belgium) Alexandre Folie (Czech Republic) Michal Schmid
April 25	Great Britain F5 Futures; Bournemouth, Great Britain; Clay $10,000	(United Kingdom) David Rice (United Kingdom) Sean Thornley; 6–3, 6–4	(Spain) Carles Poch Gradin (United Kingdom) Alexander Slabinsky	(Italy) Federico Torresi (United Kingdom) Alexander Slabinsky	(France) Gleb Sakharov (Spain) Carles Poch Gradin (Belgium) Alexandre Folie (Czech Republic) Michal Schmid
April 25	India F5 Futures; Chennai, India; Hard $10,000	(Sweden) Patrik Rosenholm; 5–6, ret.	(India) Vishnu Vardhan	(India) Vijay Sundar Prashanth (Belgium) Julien Dubail	(India) Karan Rastogi (Spain) Marc Fornell Mestres (India) Vivek Shokeen (India) Ranjeet Virali-Murugesan
April 25	India F5 Futures; Chennai, India; Hard $10,000	(India) Vijay Sundar Prashanth (India) Arun-Prakash Rajagopalan; 7–5, 6–4	(Indonesia) Elbert Sie (Thailand) Perakiat Siriluethaiwattana	(India) Vijay Sundar Prashanth (Belgium) Julien Dubail	(India) Karan Rastogi (Spain) Marc Fornell Mestres (India) Vivek Shokeen (India) Ranjeet Virali-Murugesan
April 25	Italy F7 Futures; Vicenza, Italy; Clay $15,000	(Netherlands) Matwé Middelkoop; 7–5, 2–6, 6–4	(Argentina) Juan-Martín Aranguren	(France) Grégoire Burquier (Croatia) Kristijan Mesaroš	(Austria) Philipp Oswald (Italy) Walter Trusendi (France) Romain Jouan (Italy) Nicola Ghedin
April 25	Italy F7 Futures; Vicenza, Italy; Clay $15,000	(Serbia) Ivan Bjelica (Netherlands) Matwé Middelkoop; 6–4, 6–4	(Argentina) Juan-Martín Aranguren (Argentina) Alejandro Fabbri	(France) Grégoire Burquier (Croatia) Kristijan Mesaroš	(Austria) Philipp Oswald (Italy) Walter Trusendi (France) Romain Jouan (Italy) Nicola Ghedin
April 25	Kazakhstan F1 Futures; Almaty, Kazakhstan; Hard $10,000	(Russia) Denis Matsukevich; 6–1, 6–2	(Russia) Ervand Gasparyan	(Belarus) Andrei Vasilevski (Italy) Federico Gaio	(Russia) Vitali Reshetnikov (Ukraine) Leonard Stakhovsky (Russia) Stanislav Vovk (Uzbekistan) Murad Inoyatov
April 25	Kazakhstan F1 Futures; Almaty, Kazakhstan; Hard $10,000	(Russia) Denis Matsukevich (Russia) Stanislav Vovk; 3–6, 7–6^{(8–6)}, [10–5]	(Russia) Alexander Pavlioutchenkov (Ukraine) Leonard Stakhovsky	(Belarus) Andrei Vasilevski (Italy) Federico Gaio	(Russia) Vitali Reshetnikov (Ukraine) Leonard Stakhovsky (Russia) Stanislav Vovk (Uzbekistan) Murad Inoyatov
April 25	Spain F13 Futures; Balaguer, Spain; Clay $10,000	(Spain) Roberto Carballés; 5–7, 6–4, 6–1	(Spain) Jordi Samper Montaña	(Spain) David Estruch (Germany) Matthias Kolbe	(Poland) Adam Chadaj (Germany) Steven Moneke (Spain) Andrés Artuñedo (Spain) Oriol Roca Batalla
April 25	Spain F13 Futures; Balaguer, Spain; Clay $10,000	(Germany) Matthias Kolbe (Germany) Steven Moneke; 6–1, 7–5	(Poland) Adam Chadaj (Australia) Joel Lindner	(Spain) David Estruch (Germany) Matthias Kolbe	(Poland) Adam Chadaj (Germany) Steven Moneke (Spain) Andrés Artuñedo (Spain) Oriol Roca Batalla
April 25	Turkey F15 Futures; Antalya, Turkey; Hard $10,000	(Spain) Arnau Brugués Davi; 6–3, 6–1	(Germany) Stefan Seifert	(Czech Republic) Michal Konečný (Russia) Mikhail Ledovskikh	(Russia) Dmitri Sitak (Italy) Andrea Stoppini (Moldova) Andrei Ciumac (Slovakia) Jozef Kovalík
April 25	Turkey F15 Futures; Antalya, Turkey; Hard $10,000	(Turkey) Tuna Altuna (Australia) Brydan Klein; 6–4, 6–3	(Moldova) Andrei Ciumac (Russia) Dmitri Sitak	(Czech Republic) Michal Konečný (Russia) Mikhail Ledovskikh	(Russia) Dmitri Sitak (Italy) Andrea Stoppini (Moldova) Andrei Ciumac (Slovakia) Jozef Kovalík
April 25	USA F10 Futures; Orange Park, USA; Clay $10,000	(Mexico) Daniel Garza; 1–6, 6–4, 6–1	(United States) Mitchell Frank	(South Africa) Kriegler Brink (Romania) Gabriel Moraru	(United States) Daniel Kosakowski (United States) Bjorn Fratangelo (Austria) Gerald Melzer (Italy) Matteo Marrai
April 25	USA F10 Futures; Orange Park, USA; Clay $10,000	(New Zealand) Marvin Barker (Australia) Mark Verryth; 7–5, 6–2	(Barbados) Haydn Lewis (The Bahamas) Marvin Rolle	(South Africa) Kriegler Brink (Romania) Gabriel Moraru	(United States) Daniel Kosakowski (United States) Bjorn Fratangelo (Austria) Gerald Melzer (Italy) Matteo Marrai
April 25	Venezuela F1 Futures; Caracas, Venezuela; Hard $10,000	(Venezuela) David Souto; 6–4, 3–6, 7–6^{(7–4)}	(Peru) Mauricio Echazú	(Colombia) Nicolás Barrientos (Argentina) Gustavo Sterin	(Venezuela) Román Recarte (Argentina) Armando Boschetti (Venezuela) Piero Luisi (Argentina) Patricio Heras
April 25	Venezuela F1 Futures; Caracas, Venezuela; Hard $10,000	(Venezuela) Piero Luisi (Venezuela) Román Recarte; 4–6, 6–3, [10–7]	(Peru) Mauricio Echazú (Peru) Sergio Galdós	(Colombia) Nicolás Barrientos (Argentina) Gustavo Sterin	(Venezuela) Román Recarte (Argentina) Armando Boschetti (Venezuela) Piero Luisi (Argentina) Patricio Heras

== May ==
Week of	Tournament	Winner	Runners-up	Semifinalists	Quarterfinalists
May 2	Argentina F4 Futures; Villa Allende, Argentina; Clay $10,000	(Argentina) Martín Alund; 6–4, 6–1	(Argentina) Diego Schwartzman	(Argentina) Facundo Argüello (Argentina) Juan-Pablo Amado	(Uruguay) Martín Cuevas (Argentina) Nicolás Pastor (Argentina) Renzo Olivo (Argentina) Guillermo Durán
May 2	Argentina F4 Futures; Villa Allende, Argentina; Clay $10,000	(Argentina) Juan-Pablo Amado (Argentina) Diego Schwartzman; 2–6, 6–4, [10–7]	(Argentina) Martín Alund (Argentina) Alejandro Kon	(Argentina) Facundo Argüello (Argentina) Juan-Pablo Amado	(Uruguay) Martín Cuevas (Argentina) Nicolás Pastor (Argentina) Renzo Olivo (Argentina) Guillermo Durán
May 2	B&H F1 Futures; Doboj, Bosnia & Herzegovina; Clay $10,000	(Croatia) Toni Androić; 6–4, 6–2	(Czech Republic) Jiří Školoudík	(Croatia) Dino Marcan (Bosnia and Herzegovina) Tomislav Brkić	(Serbia) Saša Stojisavljević (Germany) David Thurner (Russia) Victor Baluda (Slovenia) Tomislav Ternar
May 2	B&H F1 Futures; Doboj, Bosnia & Herzegovina; Clay $10,000	(Croatia) Toni Androić (Serbia) Ivan Bjelica; 6–3, 7–6^{(7–3)}	(Croatia) Antonio Lupieri (Croatia) Dino Marcan	(Croatia) Dino Marcan (Bosnia and Herzegovina) Tomislav Brkić	(Serbia) Saša Stojisavljević (Germany) David Thurner (Russia) Victor Baluda (Slovenia) Tomislav Ternar
May 2	Brazil F12 Futures; Teresina, Brazil; Clay $10,000	(Brazil) Tiago Lopes; 7–5, 3–1, ret.	(Czech Republic) Roman Vögeli	(Brazil) Bruno Semenzato (Brazil) Guilherme Clézar	(Chile) Javier Muñoz (Brazil) Marlon Oliveira (Brazil) Gustavo Guerses (Australia) Jared Easton
May 2	Brazil F12 Futures; Teresina, Brazil; Clay $10,000	(Brazil) Bruno Sant'Anna (Brazil) Karue Sell; 6–2, 6–7^{(3–7)}, [10–7]	(Chile) Rodrigo Pérez (Chile) Juan Carlos Sáez	(Brazil) Bruno Semenzato (Brazil) Guilherme Clézar	(Chile) Javier Muñoz (Brazil) Marlon Oliveira (Brazil) Gustavo Guerses (Australia) Jared Easton
May 2	Bulgaria F1 Futures; Varna, Bulgaria; Clay $10,000	(France) Axel Michon; 6–7^{(5–7)}, 6–3, 6–1	(Bulgaria) Tihomir Grozdanov	(Serbia) Miljan Zekić (Romania) Adrian Cruciat	(Romania) Andrei Savulescu (Romania) Victor Anagnastopol (Poland) Grzegorz Panfil (Austria) Michael Linzer
May 2	Bulgaria F1 Futures; Varna, Bulgaria; Clay $10,000	(Poland) Marcin Gawron (Poland) Grzegorz Panfil; 7–5, 6–2	(Romania) Alexandru-Daniel Carpen (Romania) Adrian Cruciat	(Serbia) Miljan Zekić (Romania) Adrian Cruciat	(Romania) Andrei Savulescu (Romania) Victor Anagnastopol (Poland) Grzegorz Panfil (Austria) Michael Linzer
May 2	Great Britain F6 Futures; Edinburgh, Great Britain; Clay (green) $10,000	(France) Mathieu Rodrigues; 6–0, 6–4	(Romania) Cătălin Gârd	(France) Charles-Antoine Brézac (United Kingdom) Alexander Slabinsky	(United Kingdom) David Rice (United Kingdom) Oliver Golding (Netherlands) Wesley Koolhof (United Kingdom) James Feaver
May 2	Great Britain F6 Futures; Edinburgh, Great Britain; Clay (green) $10,000	(United Kingdom) James Feaver (United Kingdom) Jarryd Maher; 2–6, 6–0, [10–6]	(United Kingdom) David Rice (United Kingdom) Sean Thornley	(France) Charles-Antoine Brézac (United Kingdom) Alexander Slabinsky	(United Kingdom) David Rice (United Kingdom) Oliver Golding (Netherlands) Wesley Koolhof (United Kingdom) James Feaver
May 2	Italy F8 Futures; Sanremo, Italy; Clay $10,000	(France) Jonathan Dasnières de Veigy; 6–3, 6–1	(Colombia) Cristian Rodríguez	(Switzerland) Yann Marti (Switzerland) Raphael Lustenberger	(Austria) Philipp Oswald (Belarus) Siarhei Betau (Japan) Shuichi Sekiguchi (Italy) Matteo Civarolo
May 2	Italy F8 Futures; Sanremo, Italy; Clay $10,000	(Italy) Erik Crepaldi (Italy) Claudio Grassi; 7–6^{(8–6)}, 6–7^{(3–7)}, [10–3]	(Austria) Philipp Oswald (Austria) Bertram Steinberger	(Switzerland) Yann Marti (Switzerland) Raphael Lustenberger	(Austria) Philipp Oswald (Belarus) Siarhei Betau (Japan) Shuichi Sekiguchi (Italy) Matteo Civarolo
May 2	Kazakhstan F2; Taraz, Kazakhstan; Hard $10,000	(Italy) Federico Gaio; 0–6, 6–4, 6–2	(Japan) Takuto Niki	(Russia) Stanislav Vovk (Russia) Alexander Rumyantsev	(Russia) Mikhail Biryukov (Ukraine) Leonard Stakhovsky (Kazakhstan) Denis Yevseyev (Uzbekistan) Murad Inoyatov
May 2	Kazakhstan F2; Taraz, Kazakhstan; Hard $10,000	(Russia) Mikhail Fufygin (Uzbekistan) Vaja Uzakov; 7–6^{(7–5)}, 6–4	(Russia) Denis Matsukevich (Russia) Stanislav Vovk	(Russia) Stanislav Vovk (Russia) Alexander Rumyantsev	(Russia) Mikhail Biryukov (Ukraine) Leonard Stakhovsky (Kazakhstan) Denis Yevseyev (Uzbekistan) Murad Inoyatov
May 2	Spain F14 Futures; Balaguer, Spain; Clay $10,000	(Portugal) João Sousa; 6–3, 6–1	(Japan) Taro Daniel	(Netherlands) Boy Westerhof (Spain) Gabriel Trujillo Soler	(Spain) José Checa Calvo (Spain) Marc García-Román (Spain) David Estruch (Russia) Ivan Nedelko
May 2	Spain F14 Futures; Balaguer, Spain; Clay $10,000	(Spain) Miguel Ángel López Jaén (Spain) Íñigo Cervantes Huegun; 4–6, 6–2, [10–3]	(Australia) Allen Perel (Spain) Gabriel Trujillo Soler	(Netherlands) Boy Westerhof (Spain) Gabriel Trujillo Soler	(Spain) José Checa Calvo (Spain) Marc García-Román (Spain) David Estruch (Russia) Ivan Nedelko
May 2	Sweden F1 Futures; Karlskrona, Sweden; Clay $10,000	(Sweden) Ervin Eleskovic; 7–6^{(7–4)}, 6–1	(Canada) Érik Chvojka	(France) Josselin Ouanna (Germany) Kevin Krawietz	(France) Gianni Mina (Spain) Enrique López Pérez (France) Julien Obry (Finland) Timo Nieminen
May 2	Sweden F1 Futures; Karlskrona, Sweden; Clay $10,000	(France) Gianni Mina (France) Julien Obry; 6–4, 6–1	(Sweden) Patrik Brydolf (Sweden) Milos Sekulic	(France) Josselin Ouanna (Germany) Kevin Krawietz	(France) Gianni Mina (Spain) Enrique López Pérez (France) Julien Obry (Finland) Timo Nieminen
May 2	Turkey F16 Futures; Tarsus, Turkey; Clay $10,000	(Italy) Riccardo Sinicropi; 6–2, 5–7, 6–4	(Belgium) Alexandre Folie	(Czech Republic) Michal Schmid (Moldova) Andrei Ciumac	(Russia) Mikhail Vasiliev (Spain) Carlos Calderón-Rodríguez (Spain) Marc Giner (Italy) Marco Simoni
May 2	Turkey F16 Futures; Tarsus, Turkey; Clay $10,000	(Spain) Carlos Calderón-Rodríguez (Spain) Marc Giner walkover	(Ukraine) Denys Molchanov (Russia) Mikhail Vasiliev	(Czech Republic) Michal Schmid (Moldova) Andrei Ciumac	(Russia) Mikhail Vasiliev (Spain) Carlos Calderón-Rodríguez (Spain) Marc Giner (Italy) Marco Simoni
May 2	USA F11 Futures; Orange Park, United States; Clay $10,000	(Austria) Gerald Melzer; 1–1, ret.	(Mexico) Daniel Garza	(United States) Robbye Poole (Sweden) Michael Ryderstedt	(United States) Daniel Kosakowski (New Zealand) Artem Sitak (United States) Dennis Novikov (Australia) Mark Verryth
May 2	USA F11 Futures; Orange Park, United States; Clay $10,000	(United States) Devin Britton (United States) Greg Ouellette; 6–2, 6–4	(Austria) Gerald Melzer (United States) Ty Trombetta	(United States) Robbye Poole (Sweden) Michael Ryderstedt	(United States) Daniel Kosakowski (New Zealand) Artem Sitak (United States) Dennis Novikov (Australia) Mark Verryth
May 2	Venezuela F2 Futures; Caracas, Venezuela; Hard $10,000	(Venezuela) David Souto; 6–2, 6–3	(Peru) Duilio Beretta	(Ecuador) Roberto Quiroz (Hungary) Dénes Lukács	(Venezuela) Román Recarte (Peru) Mauricio Echazú (Mexico) Mauricio Astorga (Venezuela) Ricardo Rodríguez
May 2	Venezuela F2 Futures; Caracas, Venezuela; Hard $10,000	(Venezuela) Piero Luisi (Venezuela) Román Recarte; 6–4, 6–4	(Argentina) Armando Boschetti (Brazil) Diego Matos	(Ecuador) Roberto Quiroz (Hungary) Dénes Lukács	(Venezuela) Román Recarte (Peru) Mauricio Echazú (Mexico) Mauricio Astorga (Venezuela) Ricardo Rodríguez
May 9	Argentina F5 Futures; Villa del Dique, Argentina; Clay $10,000	(Argentina) Marco Trungelliti; 6–4, 6–2	(Argentina) Diego Schwartzman	(Argentina) Martín Alund (Argentina) Juan-Pablo Amado	(Argentina) Nicolás Pastor (Argentina) Guido Andreozzi (Argentina) Juan Ignacio Londero (Argentina) Renzo Olivo
May 9	Argentina F5 Futures; Villa del Dique, Argentina; Clay $10,000	(Argentina) Gabriel Hidalgo (Argentina) Rodrigo Scattareggia; 6–0, 7–6^{(8–6)}	(Argentina) Juan-Pablo Amado (Argentina) Diego Schwartzman	(Argentina) Martín Alund (Argentina) Juan-Pablo Amado	(Argentina) Nicolás Pastor (Argentina) Guido Andreozzi (Argentina) Juan Ignacio Londero (Argentina) Renzo Olivo
May 9	B&H F2 Futures; Sarajevo, Bosnia & Herzegovina; Carpet $10,000	(Serbia) Miljan Zekić; 7–6^{(7–1)}, 6–2	(Bosnia and Herzegovina) Tomislav Brkić	(Bosnia and Herzegovina) Damir Džumhur (Serbia) David Savić	(Bosnia and Herzegovina) Aldin Šetkić (Serbia) Danilo Petrović (Croatia) Mislav Hižak (Bosnia and Herzegovina) Ismar Gorčić
May 9	B&H F2 Futures; Sarajevo, Bosnia & Herzegovina; Carpet $10,000	(Serbia) Nikola Ćaćić (Serbia) Miljan Zekić; 6–3, 6–4	(Slovenia) Rok Jarc (Slovenia) Tom Kočevar-Dešman	(Bosnia and Herzegovina) Damir Džumhur (Serbia) David Savić	(Bosnia and Herzegovina) Aldin Šetkić (Serbia) Danilo Petrović (Croatia) Mislav Hižak (Bosnia and Herzegovina) Ismar Gorčić
May 9	Brazil F13 Futures; Caldas Novas, Brazil; Clay $15,000	(Brazil) Júlio Silva; 6–4, 6–1	(Brazil) Thiago Alves	(Brazil) Marcelo Demoliner (Brazil) Guilherme Clézar	(Brazil) André Miele (Brazil) Daniel Dutra da Silva (Chile) Javier Muñoz (Brazil) Rodrigo Guidolin
May 9	Brazil F13 Futures; Caldas Novas, Brazil; Clay $15,000	(Brazil) Danilo Ferraz (Brazil) André Miele; 3–6, 6–4, [12–10]	(Brazil) Ricardo Siggia (Brazil) Thales Turini	(Brazil) Marcelo Demoliner (Brazil) Guilherme Clézar	(Brazil) André Miele (Brazil) Daniel Dutra da Silva (Chile) Javier Muñoz (Brazil) Rodrigo Guidolin
May 9	Bulgaria F2 Futures; Plovdiv, Bulgaria; Clay $10,000	(France) Axel Michon; 7–5, 6–7^{(5–7)}, 6–4	(Austria) Michael Linzer	(Poland) Marcin Gawron (Romania) Victor Anagnastopol	(Romania) Petru-Alexandru Luncanu (Bulgaria) Alexandar Lazov (Bulgaria) Tihomir Grozdanov (Romania) Ilie-Aurelian Giurgiu
May 9	Bulgaria F2 Futures; Plovdiv, Bulgaria; Clay $10,000	(Germany) Matthias Kolbe (Germany) Steven Moneke; 6–3, 6–4	(Poland) Marcin Gawron (Austria) Michael Linzer	(Poland) Marcin Gawron (Romania) Victor Anagnastopol	(Romania) Petru-Alexandru Luncanu (Bulgaria) Alexandar Lazov (Bulgaria) Tihomir Grozdanov (Romania) Ilie-Aurelian Giurgiu
May 9	China F5 Futures; Nanjing, China; Hard (indoor) $15,000	(Chinese Taipei) Chen Ti; 6–2, 1–0, ret.	(China) Wang Chuhan	(China) Zhang Ze (Japan) Junn Mitsuhashi	(Chinese Taipei) Lee Hsin-han (China) Xu Junchao (Chinese Taipei) Hsieh Cheng-peng (China) Wu Di
May 9	China F5 Futures; Nanjing, China; Hard (indoor) $15,000	(Chinese Taipei) Hsieh Cheng-peng (Chinese Taipei) Lee Hsin-han; 6–2, 6–4	(Japan) Junn Mitsuhashi (Japan) Bumpei Sato	(China) Zhang Ze (Japan) Junn Mitsuhashi	(Chinese Taipei) Lee Hsin-han (China) Xu Junchao (Chinese Taipei) Hsieh Cheng-peng (China) Wu Di
May 9	Czech Republic F1 Futures; Teplice, Czech Republic; Clay $10,000	(Czech Republic) Jiří Veselý; 3–6, 7–6^{(9–7)}, 6–1	(Slovakia) Norbert Gombos	(Estonia) Jürgen Zopp (Germany) Jan-Lennard Struff	(Austria) Marc Rath (Slovakia) Filip Horanský (Czech Republic) Jan Mertl (Belarus) Aliaksandr Bury
May 9	Czech Republic F1 Futures; Teplice, Czech Republic; Clay $10,000	(Belarus) Aliaksandr Bury (Belarus) Nikolai Fidirko; 6–3, 6–4	(Czech Republic) Roman Jebavý (Czech Republic) Michal Konečný	(Estonia) Jürgen Zopp (Germany) Jan-Lennard Struff	(Austria) Marc Rath (Slovakia) Filip Horanský (Czech Republic) Jan Mertl (Belarus) Aliaksandr Bury
May 9	Great Britain F7 Futures; Newcastle, Great Britain; Clay $10,000	(Tunisia) Malek Jaziri; 6–3, 6–4	(Belgium) Yannick Mertens	(Australia) James Duckworth (France) Jonathan Dasnières de Veigy	(United Kingdom) Morgan Phillips (Spain) Carles Poch Gradin (Spain) Pablo Martín-Adalia (United Kingdom) Richard Bloomfield
May 9	Great Britain F7 Futures; Newcastle, Great Britain; Clay $10,000	(Tunisia) Malek Jaziri (Spain) Carles Poch Gradin; 6–1, 7–6^{(7–3)}	(Spain) Pablo Martín-Adalia (United Kingdom) Morgan Phillips	(Australia) James Duckworth (France) Jonathan Dasnières de Veigy	(United Kingdom) Morgan Phillips (Spain) Carles Poch Gradin (Spain) Pablo Martín-Adalia (United Kingdom) Richard Bloomfield
May 9	Italy F9 Futures; Pozzuoli, Italy; Clay $15,000	(Netherlands) Antal van der Duim; 6–2, 6–4	(Australia) James Lemke	(Colombia) Alejandro González (Japan) Hiroki Moriya	(Germany) Marcel Zimmermann (Italy) Riccardo Bellotti (Italy) Enrico Fioravante (Italy) Claudio Grassi
May 9	Italy F9 Futures; Pozzuoli, Italy; Clay $15,000	(Italy) Erik Crepaldi (Italy) Claudio Grassi; 6–7^{(12–14)}, 6–1, [10–6]	(Colombia) Alejandro González (Colombia) Eduardo Struvay	(Colombia) Alejandro González (Japan) Hiroki Moriya	(Germany) Marcel Zimmermann (Italy) Riccardo Bellotti (Italy) Enrico Fioravante (Italy) Claudio Grassi
May 9	Kazakhstan F3 Futures; Almaty, Kazakhstan; Hard $10,000	(Italy) Federico Gaio; 6–0, 7–5	(Russia) Ilia Starkov	(Russia) Ervand Gasparyan (Russia) Mikhail Fufygin	(Russia) Denis Matsukevich (Japan) Arata Onozawa (Russia) Alexander Rumyantsev (Russia) Mikhail Biryukov
May 9	Kazakhstan F3 Futures; Almaty, Kazakhstan; Hard $10,000	(Japan) Takuto Niki (Japan) Arata Onozawa; 1–6, 7–5, [10–7]	(Russia) Mikhail Fufygin (Russia) Ilia Starkov	(Russia) Ervand Gasparyan (Russia) Mikhail Fufygin	(Russia) Denis Matsukevich (Japan) Arata Onozawa (Russia) Alexander Rumyantsev (Russia) Mikhail Biryukov
May 9	Mexico F2 Futures; Córdoba, Mexico; Hard $15,000	(Mexico) Daniel Garza; 6–3, 1–6, 6–2	(Australia) Brendan Moore	(Mexico) Miguel Ángel Reyes-Varela (Mexico) Miguel Gallardo-Vallés	(Georgia (country)) Nikoloz Basilashvili (Chinese Taipei) Jimmy Wang (Mexico) Carlos Palencia (Guatemala) Christopher Díaz Figueroa
May 9	Mexico F2 Futures; Córdoba, Mexico; Hard $15,000	(Australia) Chris Letcher (Australia) Brendan Moore; 6–4, 6–3	(United States) Adam El Mihdawy (Chinese Taipei) Jimmy Wang	(Mexico) Miguel Ángel Reyes-Varela (Mexico) Miguel Gallardo-Vallés	(Georgia (country)) Nikoloz Basilashvili (Chinese Taipei) Jimmy Wang (Mexico) Carlos Palencia (Guatemala) Christopher Díaz Figueroa
May 9	Morocco F1 Futures; Kenitra, Morocco; Clay $10,000	(Spain) Marc Fornell Mestres; 6–4, 7–5	(France) Tak Khunn Wang	(Egypt) Sherif Sabry (India) Ramkumar Ramanathan	(Bolivia) Federico Zeballos (Kuwait) Abdullah Magdas (Morocco) Yassine Idmbarek (Morocco) Anas Fattar
May 9	Morocco F1 Futures; Kenitra, Morocco; Clay $10,000	(Spain) Marc Fornell Mestres (Luxembourg) Mike Vermeer; 5–7, 7–5, [10–3]	(Kuwait) Abdullah Magdas (Egypt) Sherif Sabry	(Egypt) Sherif Sabry (India) Ramkumar Ramanathan	(Bolivia) Federico Zeballos (Kuwait) Abdullah Magdas (Morocco) Yassine Idmbarek (Morocco) Anas Fattar
May 9	Spain F15 Futures; Lleida, Spain; Clay $10,000	(Portugal) João Sousa; 6–3, 6–3	(Spain) Roberto Carballés	(Spain) Íñigo Cervantes Huegun (Netherlands) Boy Westerhof	(Japan) Taro Daniel (Spain) Roberto Ortega Olmedo (France) Loïc Ducourau (Spain) Gabriel Trujillo Soler
May 9	Spain F15 Futures; Lleida, Spain; Clay $10,000	(Spain) Arnau Dachs (France) Loïc Ducourau; 6–4, 6–4	(China) Qi Xiao (China) Wang Yingzheng	(Spain) Íñigo Cervantes Huegun (Netherlands) Boy Westerhof	(Japan) Taro Daniel (Spain) Roberto Ortega Olmedo (France) Loïc Ducourau (Spain) Gabriel Trujillo Soler
May 9	Sweden F2 Futures; Båstad, Sweden; Clay $10,000	(Finland) Timo Nieminen; 6–4, 6–3	(Romania) Cătălin Gârd	(France) Gianni Mina (United Kingdom) Daniel Smethurst	(New Zealand) Marcus Daniell (Sweden) Carl Bergman (Austria) Bastian Trinker (France) Julien Obry
May 9	Sweden F2 Futures; Båstad, Sweden; Clay $10,000	(Belgium) Germain Gigounon (United Kingdom) Daniel Smethurst; 3–6, 7–6^{(7–2)}, [10–7]	(Sweden) Carl Bergman (Finland) Timo Nieminen	(France) Gianni Mina (United Kingdom) Daniel Smethurst	(New Zealand) Marcus Daniell (Sweden) Carl Bergman (Austria) Bastian Trinker (France) Julien Obry
May 9	Turkey F17 Futures; Adana, Turkey; Clay $10,000	(Ukraine) Denys Molchanov; 6–3, 6–0	(Spain) Carlos Calderón-Rodríguez	(Italy) Roberto Marcora (Egypt) Mohamed Safwat	(Ukraine) Ivan Sergeyev (Belgium) Alexandre Folie (Czech Republic) Michal Schmid (Italy) Marco Simoni
May 9	Turkey F17 Futures; Adana, Turkey; Clay $10,000	(Republic of Ireland) Sam Barry (Republic of Ireland) Barry King; 7–6^{(7–1)}, 6–4	(Syria) Issam Haitham Taweel (Egypt) Mohamed Safwat	(Italy) Roberto Marcora (Egypt) Mohamed Safwat	(Ukraine) Ivan Sergeyev (Belgium) Alexandre Folie (Czech Republic) Michal Schmid (Italy) Marco Simoni
May 9	USA F12 Futures; Tampa, United States; Clay $10,000	(United States) Blake Strode; 6–3, 6–4	(United States) Lester Cook	(United States) Denis Kudla (United States) Robbye Poole	(Slovenia) Luka Gregorc (United Kingdom) Matthew Short (New Zealand) Artem Sitak (Barbados) Haydn Lewis
May 9	USA F12 Futures; Tampa, United States; Clay $10,000	(Australia) Ashley Fisher (South Africa) Chris Haggard; 7–6^{(7–1)}, 6–4	(Brazil) Clayton Almeida (United States) Joshua Zavala	(United States) Denis Kudla (United States) Robbye Poole	(Slovenia) Luka Gregorc (United Kingdom) Matthew Short (New Zealand) Artem Sitak (Barbados) Haydn Lewis
May 9	Venezuela F3 Futures; Caracas, Venezuela; Clay $10,000	(Venezuela) David Souto; 7–6^{(7–2)}, 6–3	(Argentina) Patricio Heras	(Colombia) Juan Sebastián Gómez (Venezuela) Luis David Martínez	(Venezuela) Román Recarte (United States) Maciek Sykut (Peru) Duilio Beretta (Argentina) Armando Boschetti
May 9	Venezuela F3 Futures; Caracas, Venezuela; Clay $10,000	(Venezuela) Piero Luisi (Venezuela) Román Recarte; 3–6, 6–2, [10–8]	(Argentina) Armando Boschetti (Barbados) Darian King	(Colombia) Juan Sebastián Gómez (Venezuela) Luis David Martínez	(Venezuela) Román Recarte (United States) Maciek Sykut (Peru) Duilio Beretta (Argentina) Armando Boschetti
May 16	B&H F3 Futures; Brčko, Bosnia & Herzegovina; Clay $10,000	(Bosnia and Herzegovina) Damir Džumhur; 6–3, 5–7, 7–5	(Bosnia and Herzegovina) Aldin Šetkić	(Serbia) Miljan Zekić (Montenegro) Goran Tošić	(Belgium) Marco Dierckx (Serbia) David Savić (United States) Janicije Sasha Karin (Croatia) Toni Androić
May 16	B&H F3 Futures; Brčko, Bosnia & Herzegovina; Clay $10,000	(Croatia) Toni Androić (Serbia) Nikola Ćaćić; 6–2, 6–3	(Serbia) Marko Rajić (Serbia) Saša Vidojević	(Serbia) Miljan Zekić (Montenegro) Goran Tošić	(Belgium) Marco Dierckx (Serbia) David Savić (United States) Janicije Sasha Karin (Croatia) Toni Androić
May 16	Brazil F14 Futures; Goiânia, Brazil; Clay $10,000	(Brazil) Guilherme Clézar; 4–6, 6–3, 7–6^{(7–3)}	(Brazil) André Miele	(Argentina) Gastón-Arturo Grimolizzi (Chile) Juan Carlos Sáez	(Uruguay) Martín Cuevas (Argentina) Facundo Mena (Bolivia) Ryusei Makiguchi (Brazil) Rodrigo Guidolin
May 16	Brazil F14 Futures; Goiânia, Brazil; Clay $10,000	(Bolivia) Mauricio Doria-Medina (Argentina) Gastón-Arturo Grimolizzi; 7–6^{(9–7)}, 6–0	(Brazil) André Ghem (Brazil) Rodrigo Guidolin	(Argentina) Gastón-Arturo Grimolizzi (Chile) Juan Carlos Sáez	(Uruguay) Martín Cuevas (Argentina) Facundo Mena (Bolivia) Ryusei Makiguchi (Brazil) Rodrigo Guidolin
May 16	Bulgaria F3 Futures; Sofia, Bulgaria; Clay $10,000	(Romania) Răzvan Sabău; 6–2, 6–3	(Italy) Enrico Burzi	(Germany) Steven Moneke (Netherlands) Boy Westerhof	(Austria) Michael Linzer (Romania) Victor Anagnastopol (Romania) Petru-Alexandru Luncanu (France) Gleb Sakharov
May 16	Bulgaria F3 Futures; Sofia, Bulgaria; Clay $10,000	(Germany) Matthias Kolbe (Germany) Steven Moneke; 6–1, 6–2	(Austria) Maximilian Neuchrist (Germany) Dominik Schulz	(Germany) Steven Moneke (Netherlands) Boy Westerhof	(Austria) Michael Linzer (Romania) Victor Anagnastopol (Romania) Petru-Alexandru Luncanu (France) Gleb Sakharov
May 16	China F6 Futures; Guiyang, China; Hard $15,000	(China) Zhang Ze; 6–1, 6–0	(Chinese Taipei) Lee Hsin-han	(Japan) Kento Takeuchi (Japan) Junn Mitsuhashi	(China) Bei Liu (Canada) Kelsey Stevenson (Chinese Taipei) Chen Ti (China) Wu Di
May 16	China F6 Futures; Guiyang, China; Hard $15,000	(Chinese Taipei) Hsieh Cheng-peng (Chinese Taipei) Lee Hsin-han; 6–4, 7–6^{(7–3)}	(Chinese Taipei) Huang Liang-chi (China) Ouyang Bowen	(Japan) Kento Takeuchi (Japan) Junn Mitsuhashi	(China) Bei Liu (Canada) Kelsey Stevenson (Chinese Taipei) Chen Ti (China) Wu Di
May 16	Czech Republic F2 Futures; Most, Czech Republic; Clay $10,000	(Austria) Daniel Köllerer; 6–3, 6–2	(Czech Republic) Lubomír Majšajdr	(Belarus) Aliaksandr Bury (Czech Republic) Lukáš Dlouhý	(Germany) Peter Torebko (Czech Republic) Jiří Veselý (Germany) Peter Gojowczyk (United Kingdom) Jarryd Maher
May 16	Czech Republic F2 Futures; Most, Czech Republic; Clay $10,000	(Czech Republic) Roman Jebavý (Latvia) Andis Juška; 6–3, 7–5	(Austria) Markus Egger (Austria) Daniel Köllerer	(Belarus) Aliaksandr Bury (Czech Republic) Lukáš Dlouhý	(Germany) Peter Torebko (Czech Republic) Jiří Veselý (Germany) Peter Gojowczyk (United Kingdom) Jarryd Maher
May 16	Israel F4 Futures; Ramat HaSharon, Israel; Hard $10,000	(Israel) Amir Weintraub; 6–3, 6–2	(United Kingdom) David Rice	(Ukraine) Stanislav Poplavskyy (Czech Republic) Michal Schmid	(Israel) Gilad Ben Zvi (Israel) Dekel Bar (United Kingdom) Sean Thornley (Switzerland) Yann Minster
May 16	Israel F4 Futures; Ramat HaSharon, Israel; Hard $10,000	(United Kingdom) David Rice (United Kingdom) Sean Thornley; 3–6, 6–3, [11–9]	(Israel) Tal Eros (Israel) Amir Weintraub	(Ukraine) Stanislav Poplavskyy (Czech Republic) Michal Schmid	(Israel) Gilad Ben Zvi (Israel) Dekel Bar (United Kingdom) Sean Thornley (Switzerland) Yann Minster
May 16	Italy F10 Futures; Aosta, Italy; Hard $10,000	(Italy) Alessandro Giannessi; 6–4, 7–6^{(9–7)}	(Colombia) Eduardo Struvay	(Germany) Marcel Zimmermann (Italy) Matteo Marrai	(Switzerland) Yann Marti (Italy) Giulio Torroni (Japan) Shuichi Sekiguchi (Italy) Erik Crepaldi
May 16	Italy F10 Futures; Aosta, Italy; Hard $10,000	(Moldova) Radu Albot (Japan) Yasutaka Uchiyama; 4–6, 7–5, [10–7]	(Japan) Hiroki Moriya (Japan) Shuichi Sekiguchi	(Germany) Marcel Zimmermann (Italy) Matteo Marrai	(Switzerland) Yann Marti (Italy) Giulio Torroni (Japan) Shuichi Sekiguchi (Italy) Erik Crepaldi
May 16	Korea F1 Futures; Daegu, South Korea; Hard $15,000	(South Korea) Kim Young-jun; 6–4, 6–4	(South Korea) Lim Yong-kyu	(Canada) Vasek Pospisil (Germany) Andre Begemann	(South Korea) An Jae-sung (South Korea) Daniel Yoo (South Korea) Im Seong-hyeon (Germany) Jaan-Frederik Brunken
May 16	Korea F1 Futures; Daegu, South Korea; Hard $15,000	(South Korea) An Jae-sung (South Korea) Kim Young-jun; 5–7, 7–5, [10–4]	(Germany) Jaan-Frederik Brunken (United States) Michael McClune	(Canada) Vasek Pospisil (Germany) Andre Begemann	(South Korea) An Jae-sung (South Korea) Daniel Yoo (South Korea) Im Seong-hyeon (Germany) Jaan-Frederik Brunken
May 16	Mexico F3 Futures; Mexico City, Mexico; Hard $15,000	(Chinese Taipei) Jimmy Wang; 7–5, 7–5	(Mexico) Miguel Gallardo-Vallés	(Australia) Marvin Barker (Argentina) Christopher Díaz Figueroa	(Moldova) Roman Borvanov (United States) Nathaniel Schnugg (Mexico) Manuel Sánchez (United States) Adam El Mihdawy
May 16	Mexico F3 Futures; Mexico City, Mexico; Hard $15,000	(Barbados) Darian King (Barbados) Haydn Lewis; 6–3, 6–4	(Argentina) Christopher Díaz Figueroa (Mexico) Miguel Gallardo-Vallés	(Australia) Marvin Barker (Argentina) Christopher Díaz Figueroa	(Moldova) Roman Borvanov (United States) Nathaniel Schnugg (Mexico) Manuel Sánchez (United States) Adam El Mihdawy
May 16	Morocco F2 Futures; Rabat, Morocco; Clay $10,000	(Lebanon) Bassam Beidas; 4–6, 6–1, 6–2	(France) Tak Khunn Wang	(Morocco) Anas Fattar (Egypt) Karim Maamoun	(Kuwait) Abdullah Magdas (Morocco) Yassine Idmbarek (Egypt) Karim-Mohamed Maamoun (Morocco) Talal Ouahabi
May 16	Morocco F2 Futures; Rabat, Morocco; Clay $10,000	(Spain) Marc Fornell Mestres (Luxembourg) Mike Vermeer; 6–1, 6–4	(Lebanon) Bassam Beidas (Egypt) Karim Maamoun	(Morocco) Anas Fattar (Egypt) Karim Maamoun	(Kuwait) Abdullah Magdas (Morocco) Yassine Idmbarek (Egypt) Karim-Mohamed Maamoun (Morocco) Talal Ouahabi
May 16	Paraguay F1 Futures; Encarnación, Paraguay; Clay $15,000	(Argentina) Martín Alund; 6–3, 6–1	(Paraguay) Diego Galeano	(Argentina) Guido Pella (Argentina) Marco Trungelliti	(Chile) Cristóbal Saavedra Corvalán (Brazil) Marcelo Demoliner (Argentina) Guillermo Durán (Brazil) Daniel Dutra da Silva
May 16	Paraguay F1 Futures; Encarnación, Paraguay; Clay $15,000	(Paraguay) Diego Galeano (Paraguay) Daniel-Alejandro López; 7–5, 6–3	(Argentina) Joaquín-Jesús Monteferrario (Chile) Cristóbal Saavedra Corvalán	(Argentina) Guido Pella (Argentina) Marco Trungelliti	(Chile) Cristóbal Saavedra Corvalán (Brazil) Marcelo Demoliner (Argentina) Guillermo Durán (Brazil) Daniel Dutra da Silva
May 16	Poland F1 Futures; Kraków, Poland; Clay $15,000	(Australia) James Duckworth; 6–3, 6–4	(Poland) Grzegorz Panfil	(Australia) Maverick Banes (Czech Republic) Jiří Školoudík	(Poland) Marcin Gawron (Chile) Hans Podlipnik (Poland) Błażej Koniusz (Slovakia) Kamil Čapkovič
May 16	Poland F1 Futures; Kraków, Poland; Clay $15,000	(Slovakia) Kamil Čapkovič (Chile) Hans Podlipnik walkover	(Poland) Marcin Gawron (Poland) Grzegorz Panfil	(Australia) Maverick Banes (Czech Republic) Jiří Školoudík	(Poland) Marcin Gawron (Chile) Hans Podlipnik (Poland) Błażej Koniusz (Slovakia) Kamil Čapkovič
May 16	South Africa F1 Futures; Durban, South Africa; Hard $15,000	(South Africa) Ruan Roelofse; 6–4, 7–5	(Austria) Nikolaus Moser	(United Kingdom) Alexander Ward (United Kingdom) Lewis Burton	(United Kingdom) Joshua Milton (South Africa) Nikala Scholtz (Australia) Benjamin Mitchell (Australia) Isaac Frost
May 16	South Africa F1 Futures; Durban, South Africa; Hard $15,000	(Australia) Isaac Frost (Australia) Leon Frost; 6–3, 6–4	(United Kingdom) Lewis Burton (United Kingdom) James Marsalek	(United Kingdom) Alexander Ward (United Kingdom) Lewis Burton	(United Kingdom) Joshua Milton (South Africa) Nikala Scholtz (Australia) Benjamin Mitchell (Australia) Isaac Frost
May 16	Spain F16 Futures; Valldoreix, Spain; Clay $10,000	(Spain) Ignacio Coll Riudavets; 6–2, 3–6, 6–3	(Spain) David Estruch	(China) Chang Yu (Spain) Oriol Roca Batalla	(Canada) Steven Diez (China) Ma Yanan (Russia) Alexander Pavlioutchenkov (Spain) Gabriel Trujillo Soler
May 16	Spain F16 Futures; Valldoreix, Spain; Clay $10,000	(Australia) Allen Perel (Spain) Gabriel Trujillo Soler; 6–1, 7–6^{(7–1)}	(Spain) Iván Arenas Gualda (Spain) Antonio García Sánchez	(China) Chang Yu (Spain) Oriol Roca Batalla	(Canada) Steven Diez (China) Ma Yanan (Russia) Alexander Pavlioutchenkov (Spain) Gabriel Trujillo Soler
May 16	Sweden F3 Futures; Båstad, Sweden; Clay $10,000	(France) Julien Obry; 6–1, 6–0	(Germany) Kevin Krawietz	(United Kingdom) Daniel Smethurst (Australia) Rameez Junaid	(Finland) Timo Nieminen (Sweden) Patrik Rosenholm (Finland) Henrik Sillanpää (Sweden) Patrik Brydolf
May 16	Sweden F3 Futures; Båstad, Sweden; Clay $10,000	(Australia) Rameez Junaid (Spain) Óscar Sabaté-Bretos; 3–6, 7–6^{(8–6)}, [10–4]	(Sweden) Patrik Brydolf (Sweden) Milos Sekulic	(United Kingdom) Daniel Smethurst (Australia) Rameez Junaid	(Finland) Timo Nieminen (Sweden) Patrik Rosenholm (Finland) Henrik Sillanpää (Sweden) Patrik Brydolf
May 16	Turkey F18 Futures; Samsun, Turkey; Clay $10,000	(Ukraine) Denys Molchanov; 6–3, 7–6^{(7–4)}	(Belgium) Alexandre Folie	(Egypt) Mohamed Safwat (Argentina) Francesco Picco	(Italy) Alessandro Petrone (Moldova) Andrei Ciumac (Czech Republic) Radim Urbánek (Austria) Bertram Steinberger
May 16	Turkey F18 Futures; Samsun, Turkey; Clay $10,000	(Moldova) Andrei Ciumac (Ukraine) Denys Molchanov; 6–3, 6–2	(Republic of Ireland) Sam Barry (Republic of Ireland) Barry King	(Egypt) Mohamed Safwat (Argentina) Francesco Picco	(Italy) Alessandro Petrone (Moldova) Andrei Ciumac (Czech Republic) Radim Urbánek (Austria) Bertram Steinberger
May 23	B&H F4 Futures; Prijedor, Bosnia & Herzegovina; Clay $10,000	(Bosnia and Herzegovina) Tomislav Brkić; 6–4, 7–6^{(11–9)}	(Bosnia and Herzegovina) Mirza Bašić	(Croatia) Joško Topić (Serbia) Arsenije Zlatanović	(Croatia) Toni Androić (Slovenia) Tom Kočevar-Dešman (Croatia) Antonio Sančić (Bosnia and Herzegovina) Aldin Šetkić
May 23	B&H F4 Futures; Prijedor, Bosnia & Herzegovina; Clay $10,000	(Croatia) Toni Androić (Serbia) Nikola Ćaćić; 6–3, 6–2	(Slovenia) Rok Jarc (Slovenia) Tom Kočevar-Dešman	(Croatia) Joško Topić (Serbia) Arsenije Zlatanović	(Croatia) Toni Androić (Slovenia) Tom Kočevar-Dešman (Croatia) Antonio Sančić (Bosnia and Herzegovina) Aldin Šetkić
May 23	Brazil F15 Futures; Porto Alegre, Brazil; Clay $10,000	(Brazil) Guilherme Clézar; 6–4, 1–6, 6–3	(Brazil) Rodrigo Guidolin	(Brazil) Eduardo Dischinger (Brazil) Tiago Lopes	(Brazil) André Ghem (Brazil) André Miele (Argentina) Gastón-Arturo Grimolizzi (Argentina) Patricio Heras
May 23	Brazil F15 Futures; Porto Alegre, Brazil; Clay $10,000	(Brazil) Eduardo Dischinger (Brazil) Rodrigo Guidolin; 6–3, 6–3	(Argentina) Patricio Heras (Argentina) Gustavo Sterin	(Brazil) Eduardo Dischinger (Brazil) Tiago Lopes	(Brazil) André Ghem (Brazil) André Miele (Argentina) Gastón-Arturo Grimolizzi (Argentina) Patricio Heras
May 23	Czech Republic F3 Futures; Jablonec, Czech Republic; Clay $10,000	(Austria) Marc Rath; 6–1, 7–5	(France) Mathieu Rodrigues	(Austria) Nicolas Reissig (Czech Republic) Roman Jebavý	(Czech Republic) Jan Mertl (Canada) Érik Chvojka (Czech Republic) Jan Šátral (Slovakia) Norbert Gombos
May 23	Czech Republic F3 Futures; Jablonec, Czech Republic; Clay $10,000	(Czech Republic) Michal Schmid (Czech Republic) Roman Vögeli; 6–3, 6–2	(Slovakia) Michal Pažický (Slovakia) Adrian Sikora	(Austria) Nicolas Reissig (Czech Republic) Roman Jebavý	(Czech Republic) Jan Mertl (Canada) Érik Chvojka (Czech Republic) Jan Šátral (Slovakia) Norbert Gombos
May 23	India F6 Futures; Manipal, Indie; Hard $10,000	(India) Rohan Gajjar; 3–6, 6–3, 6–3	(India) Vijayant Malik	(India) Ranjeet Virali-Murugesan (Japan) Takuto Niki	(India) Ankit Sachdeva (India) Kaza Vinayak Sharma (Russia) Vitali Reshetnikov (India) Vikram Reddy B
May 23	India F6 Futures; Manipal, Indie; Hard $10,000	(India) Rohan Gajjar (Russia) Vitali Reshetnikov; 6–1, 6–2	(India) Vijayant Malik (India) Vivek Shokeen	(India) Ranjeet Virali-Murugesan (Japan) Takuto Niki	(India) Ankit Sachdeva (India) Kaza Vinayak Sharma (Russia) Vitali Reshetnikov (India) Vikram Reddy B
May 23	Indonesia F1 Futures; Jakarta, Indonesia; Hard $10,000	(Indonesia) Christopher Rungkat; 6–4, 6–3	(Germany) Richard Becker	(Chinese Taipei) Huang Liang-chi (Japan) Arata Onozawa	(Cambodia) Bun Kenny (China) Gao Peng (Chinese Taipei) Lee Hsin-han (Japan) Yuichi Ito
May 23	Indonesia F1 Futures; Jakarta, Indonesia; Hard $10,000	(Chinese Taipei) Hsieh Cheng-peng (Chinese Taipei) Lee Hsin-han; 7–6^{(7–5)}, 7–6^{(7–4)}	(Japan) Yuichi Ito (Japan) Kento Takeuchi	(Chinese Taipei) Huang Liang-chi (Japan) Arata Onozawa	(Cambodia) Bun Kenny (China) Gao Peng (Chinese Taipei) Lee Hsin-han (Japan) Yuichi Ito
May 23	Israel F5 Futures; Ramat HaSharon, Israel; Hard $10,000	(Israel) Amir Weintraub; 6–1, 6–1	(United Kingdom) David Rice	(Israel) Gilad Ben Zvi (Israel) Noam Okun	(United Kingdom) Sean Thornley (Republic of Ireland) Sam Barry (Ukraine) Stanislav Poplavskyy (Israel) Tal Eros
May 23	Israel F5 Futures; Ramat HaSharon, Israel; Hard $10,000	(United States) John Paul Fruttero (Israel) Amir Weintraub; 6–7^{(4–7)}, 7–6^{(7–3)}, [13–11]	(United Kingdom) David Rice (United Kingdom) Sean Thornley	(Israel) Gilad Ben Zvi (Israel) Noam Okun	(United Kingdom) Sean Thornley (Republic of Ireland) Sam Barry (Ukraine) Stanislav Poplavskyy (Israel) Tal Eros
May 23	Italy F11 Futures; Cesena, Italy; Clay $10,000	(Moldova) Radu Albot; 2–6, 6–2, 7–6^{(7–1)}	(Italy) Walter Trusendi	(Serbia) Nikola Ćirić (Uzbekistan) Farrukh Dustov	(Italy) Antonio Comporto (Italy) Giacomo Oradini (Chile) Hans Podlipnik Castillo (Austria) Max Raditschnigg
May 23	Italy F11 Futures; Cesena, Italy; Clay $10,000	(Chile) Hans Podlipnik Castillo (Austria) Max Raditschnigg; 6–3, 6–3	(Italy) Claudio Grassi (Italy) Walter Trusendi	(Serbia) Nikola Ćirić (Uzbekistan) Farrukh Dustov	(Italy) Antonio Comporto (Italy) Giacomo Oradini (Chile) Hans Podlipnik Castillo (Austria) Max Raditschnigg
May 23	Korea F2 Futures; Changwon, South Korea; Hard $10,000	(Canada) Vasek Pospisil; 7–5, 6–4	(South Korea) Lim Yong-kyu	(Chinese Taipei) Yang Tsung-hua (United Kingdom) Jamie Baker	(Japan) Hiroki Kondo (South Korea) An Jae-sung (China) Li Zhe (South Korea) Jun Woong-sun
May 23	Korea F2 Futures; Changwon, South Korea; Hard $10,000	(Chinese Taipei) Chen Ti (Japan) Hiroki Kondo; 6–4, 6–2	(South Korea) Im Kyu-tae (South Korea) Lim Yong-kyu	(Chinese Taipei) Yang Tsung-hua (United Kingdom) Jamie Baker	(Japan) Hiroki Kondo (South Korea) An Jae-sung (China) Li Zhe (South Korea) Jun Woong-sun
May 23	Mexico F4 Futures; Guadalajara, Mexico; Hard $10,000	(Uruguay) Marcel Felder; 6–3, 6–2	(Guatemala) Christopher Díaz Figueroa	(Moldova) Roman Borvanov (Bulgaria) Boris Nicola Bakalov	(Mexico) Daniel Garza (Mexico) Miguel Gallardo-Vallés (Serbia) Vladimir Obradović (Australia) Nima Roshan
May 23	Mexico F4 Futures; Guadalajara, Mexico; Hard $10,000	(Mexico) Luis Díaz Barriga (Mexico) Antonio Ruiz-Rosales; 7–6^{(9–7)}, 6–4	(Barbados) Darian King (Barbados) Haydn Lewis	(Moldova) Roman Borvanov (Bulgaria) Boris Nicola Bakalov	(Mexico) Daniel Garza (Mexico) Miguel Gallardo-Vallés (Serbia) Vladimir Obradović (Australia) Nima Roshan
May 23	Morocco F3 Futures; Agadir, Morocco; Clay $10,000	(Lithuania) Laurynas Grigelis; 6–0, 6–0	(Lebanon) Bassam Beidas	(Egypt) Sherif Sabry (Spain) Marc Fornell Mestres	(Romania) Cătălin Gârd (Republic of Ireland) James McGee (Spain) Carles Poch Gradin (Egypt) Karim Maamoun
May 23	Morocco F3 Futures; Agadir, Morocco; Clay $10,000	(Spain) Enrique López Pérez (Netherlands) Mark Vervoort; 6–3, 6–1	(Portugal) Gonçalo Pereira (Italy) Matthieu Vierin	(Egypt) Sherif Sabry (Spain) Marc Fornell Mestres	(Romania) Cătălin Gârd (Republic of Ireland) James McGee (Spain) Carles Poch Gradin (Egypt) Karim Maamoun
May 23	Paraguay F2 Futures; Asunción, Paraguay; Clay $15,000	(Peru) Duilio Beretta; 4–6, 7–6^{(7–2)}, 6–3	(Argentina) Marco Trungelliti	(Brazil) Daniel Dutra da Silva (Argentina) Facundo Argüello	(Argentina) Valentín Florez (Argentina) Juan-Pablo Amado (Chile) Cristóbal Saavedra Corválan (Argentina) Agustín Velotti
May 23	Paraguay F2 Futures; Asunción, Paraguay; Clay $15,000	(Argentina) Juan-Pablo Amado (Argentina) Guido Andreozzi; 6–3, 6–1	(Argentina) Joaquín-Jesús Monteferrario (Chile) Cristóbal Saavedra Corválan	(Brazil) Daniel Dutra da Silva (Argentina) Facundo Argüello	(Argentina) Valentín Florez (Argentina) Juan-Pablo Amado (Chile) Cristóbal Saavedra Corválan (Argentina) Agustín Velotti
May 23	Poland F2 Futures; Katowice, Poland; Clay $15,000	(Poland) Marcin Gawron; 6–4, 6–2	(Australia) James Duckworth	(Poland) Jerzy Janowicz (Belgium) Yannick Mertens	(Czech Republic) Michal Konečný (Poland) Błażej Koniusz (Slovakia) Pavol Červenák (Australia) Matt Reid
May 23	Poland F2 Futures; Katowice, Poland; Clay $15,000	(Poland) Piotr Gadomski (Poland) Maciej Smoła; 6–2, 7–6^{(10–8)}	(Poland) Rafał Gozdur (Poland) Mateusz Szmigiel	(Poland) Jerzy Janowicz (Belgium) Yannick Mertens	(Czech Republic) Michal Konečný (Poland) Błażej Koniusz (Slovakia) Pavol Červenák (Australia) Matt Reid
May 23	Romania F1 Futures; Bucharest, Romania; Clay $10,000	(Romania) Petru-Alexandru Luncanu; 3–6, 6–4, 7–5	(Romania) Marius Copil	(Romania) Gabriel Moraru (Italy) Giulio Torroni	(Romania) Victor Anagnastopol (Romania) Adrian Cruciat (France) Gleb Sakharov (Romania) Artemon Apostu-Efremov
May 23	Romania F1 Futures; Bucharest, Romania; Clay $10,000	(Romania) Teodor-Dacian Crăciun (Belgium) Yannik Reuter; 7–6^{(7–4)}, 6–2	(Romania) Artemon Apostu-Efremov (Romania) Adrian Gavrila	(Romania) Gabriel Moraru (Italy) Giulio Torroni	(Romania) Victor Anagnastopol (Romania) Adrian Cruciat (France) Gleb Sakharov (Romania) Artemon Apostu-Efremov
May 23	South Africa F2 Futures; Durban, South Africa; Hard $15,000	(Hungary) Dénes Lukács; 6–2, 6–0	(United Kingdom) Joshua Milton	(United Kingdom) Alexander Ward (Austria) Nikolaus Moser	(Australia) Michael Look (South Africa) Ruan Roelofse (South Africa) Nikala Scholtz (Greece) Theodoros Angelinos
May 23	South Africa F2 Futures; Durban, South Africa; Hard $15,000	(Austria) Nikolaus Moser (Austria) Richard Ruckelshausen; 6–2, 7–5	(Namibia) Jean Erasmus (United States) Edward Louies Oueilhe	(United Kingdom) Alexander Ward (Austria) Nikolaus Moser	(Australia) Michael Look (South Africa) Ruan Roelofse (South Africa) Nikala Scholtz (Greece) Theodoros Angelinos
May 23	Spain F17 Futures; Getxo, Spain; Clay $10,000	(Spain) Guillermo Olaso; 5–7, 6–0, 6–2	(Spain) Gerard Granollers	(Spain) David Estruch (Spain) Marc Giner	(United Kingdom) Alexander Slabinsky (Spain) Rafael Mazón-Hernández (Russia) Vladislav Dubinsky (Japan) Taro Daniel
May 23	Spain F17 Futures; Getxo, Spain; Clay $10,000	(Spain) Carlos Calderón-Rodríguez (Spain) Gerard Granollers; 6–3, 6–3	(Spain) Iván Arenas-Gualda (Spain) Antonio García Sánchez	(Spain) David Estruch (Spain) Marc Giner	(United Kingdom) Alexander Slabinsky (Spain) Rafael Mazón-Hernández (Russia) Vladislav Dubinsky (Japan) Taro Daniel
May 23	Turkey F19 Futures; Antalya, Turkey; Clay $10,000	(Ukraine) Denys Molchanov; 6–0, 7–5	(Greece) Paris Gemouchidis	(Egypt) Mohamed Safwat (Spain) Roberto Ortega Olmedo	(Republic of Ireland) Barry King (Italy) Erik Crepaldi (Turkey) Haluk Akkoyun (Russia) Ivan Nedelko
May 23	Turkey F19 Futures; Antalya, Turkey; Clay $10,000	(Moldova) Andrei Ciumac (Ukraine) Denys Molchanov; 7–5, 7–6^{(7–4)}	(Republic of Ireland) Daniel Glancy (Republic of Ireland) Barry King	(Egypt) Mohamed Safwat (Spain) Roberto Ortega Olmedo	(Republic of Ireland) Barry King (Italy) Erik Crepaldi (Turkey) Haluk Akkoyun (Russia) Ivan Nedelko
May 23	Uzbekistan F1 Futures; Andijan, Uzbekistan; Hard $15,000	(Finland) Harri Heliövaara; 6–4, 6–4	(New Zealand) Michael Venus	(Russia) Mikhail Vasiliev (Uzbekistan) Sarvar Ikramov	(Russia) Denis Matsukevich (Switzerland) Adrien Bossel (Slovakia) Miloslav Mečíř Jr. (South Africa) Raven Klaasen
May 23	Uzbekistan F1 Futures; Andijan, Uzbekistan; Hard $15,000	(Russia) Ervand Gasparyan (Finland) Harri Heliövaara; 6–4, 7–5	(Russia) Alexander Rumyantsev (Russia) Andrei Vasilevski	(Russia) Mikhail Vasiliev (Uzbekistan) Sarvar Ikramov	(Russia) Denis Matsukevich (Switzerland) Adrien Bossel (Slovakia) Miloslav Mečíř Jr. (South Africa) Raven Klaasen
May 30	B&H F5 Futures; Kiseljak, Bosnia & Herzegovina; Clay $10,000	(Slovakia) Jozef Kovalík; 6–3, 6–4	(Bosnia and Herzegovina) Aldin Šetkić	(Bosnia and Herzegovina) Damir Džumhur (Italy) Enrico Burzi	(Serbia) Danilo Petrović (Italy) Roberto Marcora (Croatia) Toni Androić (Croatia) Marin Franjičević
May 30	B&H F5 Futures; Kiseljak, Bosnia & Herzegovina; Clay $10,000	(Croatia) Toni Androić (Serbia) Nikola Ćaćić; 7–5, 6–4	(Bosnia and Herzegovina) Damir Džumhur (Bosnia and Herzegovina) Ismar Gorčić	(Bosnia and Herzegovina) Damir Džumhur (Italy) Enrico Burzi	(Serbia) Danilo Petrović (Italy) Roberto Marcora (Croatia) Toni Androić (Croatia) Marin Franjičević
May 30	Brazil F16 Futures; Marília, Brazil; Clay $10,000	(Brazil) Fabiano de Paula; 7–5, 6–4	(Brazil) Nicolás Santos	(Brazil) Daniel Dutra da Silva (Brazil) Tiago Lopes	(Brazil) Thiago Alves (Brazil) Raúl Francisquiny (Brazil) André Miele (Uruguay) Martín Cuevas
May 30	Brazil F16 Futures; Marília, Brazil; Clay $10,000	(Brazil) Tiago Lopes (Brazil) André Miele; 2–6, 6–4, [10–6]	(Argentina) Guido Andreozzi (Uruguay) Martín Cuevas	(Brazil) Daniel Dutra da Silva (Brazil) Tiago Lopes	(Brazil) Thiago Alves (Brazil) Raúl Francisquiny (Brazil) André Miele (Uruguay) Martín Cuevas
May 30	Guam F1 Futures; Tumon, Guam; Hard $10,000	(South Korea) Daniel Yoo; 6–4, 6–2	(Japan) Jun Ito	(Japan) Yasutaka Uchiyama (Australia) Brendan Moore	(Japan) Bumpei Sato (Japan) Junn Mitsuhashi (Japan) Hiroyasu Ehara (Japan) Toshihide Matsui
May 30	Guam F1 Futures; Tumon, Guam; Hard $10,000	(Australia) Isaac Frost (Australia) Brendan Moore; 7–6^{(7–4)}, 6–3	(Japan) Bumpei Sato (South Korea) Daniel Yoo	(Japan) Yasutaka Uchiyama (Australia) Brendan Moore	(Japan) Bumpei Sato (Japan) Junn Mitsuhashi (Japan) Hiroyasu Ehara (Japan) Toshihide Matsui
May 30	India F7 Futures; Delhi, India; Hard $10,000	(Sweden) Patrik Rosenholm; 6–4, 6–4	(India) Divij Sharan	(Russia) Vitali Reshetnikov (India) Vijayant Malik	(Sweden) Lucas Renard (India) Rohan Gajjar (India) Ranjeet Virali-Murugesan (India) Karunuday Singh
May 30	India F7 Futures; Delhi, India; Hard $10,000	(India) Rohan Gajjar (India) Divij Sharan; 6–2, 7–6^{(9–7)}	(Japan) Takuto Niki (Russia) Vitali Reshetnikov	(Russia) Vitali Reshetnikov (India) Vijayant Malik	(Sweden) Lucas Renard (India) Rohan Gajjar (India) Ranjeet Virali-Murugesan (India) Karunuday Singh
May 30	Indonesia F2 Futures; Surabaya, Indonesia; Hard $10,000	(Indonesia) Christopher Rungkat; 7–6^{(7–5)}, 7–6^{(7–5)}	(Japan) Arata Onozawa	(Australia) Mark Verryth (Japan) Kento Takeuchi	(Indonesia) Seno Hartono Suwandi (China) Gao Wan (Thailand) Warit Sornbutnark (Germany) Richard Becker
May 30	Indonesia F2 Futures; Surabaya, Indonesia; Hard $10,000	(Thailand) Weerapat Doakmaiklee (Indonesia) Christopher Rungkat; 6–4, 7–5	(Chinese Taipei) Huang Liang-chi (China) Ouyang Bowen	(Australia) Mark Verryth (Japan) Kento Takeuchi	(Indonesia) Seno Hartono Suwandi (China) Gao Wan (Thailand) Warit Sornbutnark (Germany) Richard Becker
May 30	Iran F1 Futures; Tehran, Iran; Clay $15,000	(Italy) Matteo Marrai; 6–3, 6–1	(Russia) Ivan Nedelko	(Russia) Stanislav Vovk (Slovakia) Kamil Čapkovic	(Syria) Marc Abdulnour (Canada) Mo Niaki (Sweden) Daniel Berta (Germany) Alex Satschko
May 30	Iran F1 Futures; Tehran, Iran; Clay $15,000	(Russia) Alexander Pavlioutchenkov (Russia) Stanislav Vovk; 6–4, 6–1	(Italy) Matteo Marrai (Germany) Alex Satschko	(Russia) Stanislav Vovk (Slovakia) Kamil Čapkovic	(Syria) Marc Abdulnour (Canada) Mo Niaki (Sweden) Daniel Berta (Germany) Alex Satschko
May 30	Israel F6 Futures; Ashkelon, Israel; Hard $10,000	(Israel) Amir Weintraub; 6–4, 6–2	(Italy) Federico Gaio	(Israel) Tal Eros (Greece) Theodoros Angelinos	(United Kingdom) Joshua Jones (Italy) Emanuele Molina (Israel) Gilad Ben Zvi (United Kingdom) Oliver Hudson
May 30	Israel F6 Futures; Ashkelon, Israel; Hard $10,000	(Republic of Ireland) James Cluskey (United States) John Paul Fruttero; 6–3, 6–0	(Israel) Noam Behr (Israel) Igor Smilansky	(Israel) Tal Eros (Greece) Theodoros Angelinos	(United Kingdom) Joshua Jones (Italy) Emanuele Molina (Israel) Gilad Ben Zvi (United Kingdom) Oliver Hudson
May 30	Italy F12 Futures; Bergamo, Italy; Clay $10,000	(Italy) Stefano Travaglia; 6–2, 6–2	(Sweden) Christian Lindell	(Italy) Marco Cecchinato (Lithuania) Laurynas Grigelis	(Australia) John Millman (Serbia) Filip Krajinović (Italy) Claudio Grassi (Switzerland) Yann Marti
May 30	Italy F12 Futures; Bergamo, Italy; Clay $10,000	(Italy) Giorgio Portaluri (Argentina) Juan-Pablo Villar; 5–7, 6–3, [10–8]	(Lithuania) Laurynas Grigelis (Italy) Riccardo Sinicropi	(Italy) Marco Cecchinato (Lithuania) Laurynas Grigelis	(Australia) John Millman (Serbia) Filip Krajinović (Italy) Claudio Grassi (Switzerland) Yann Marti
May 30	Korea F3 Futures; Gimcheon, South Korea; Hard $15,000	(South Korea) Im Kyu-tae; 6–2, 6–2	(China) Wu Di	(China) Li Zhe (South Korea) Kwon Oh-hee	(China) Gong Maoxin (South Korea) Lim Yong-kyu (South Korea) Kim Young-jun (South Korea) Song Min-kyu
May 30	Korea F3 Futures; Gimcheon, South Korea; Hard $15,000	(Japan) Hiroki Kondo (Chinese Taipei) Yi Chu-huan; 0–6, 6–3, [10–5]	(South Korea) Oh Dae-soung (South Korea) Seol Jae-min	(China) Li Zhe (South Korea) Kwon Oh-hee	(China) Gong Maoxin (South Korea) Lim Yong-kyu (South Korea) Kim Young-jun (South Korea) Song Min-kyu
May 30	Mexico F5 Futures; Celaya, Mexico; Hard $10,000	(Mexico) Miguel Gallardo-Vallés; 6–3, 6–4	(Moldova) Roman Borvanov	(Guatemala) Christopher Díaz Figueroa (Uruguay) Marcel Felder	(New Zealand) Marvin Barker (Serbia) Vladimir Obradović (Australia) Nima Roshan (United States) Adam El Mihdawy
May 30	Mexico F5 Futures; Celaya, Mexico; Hard $10,000	(Guatemala) Christopher Díaz Figueroa (Uruguay) Marcel Felder; 3–6, 6–3, [10–5]	(Mexico) Luis Díaz Barriga (Mexico) Miguel Ángel Reyes-Varela	(Guatemala) Christopher Díaz Figueroa (Uruguay) Marcel Felder	(New Zealand) Marvin Barker (Serbia) Vladimir Obradović (Australia) Nima Roshan (United States) Adam El Mihdawy
May 30	Poland F3 Futures; Koszalin, Poland; Clay $10,000	(Poland) Marcin Gawron; 6–4, 6–2	(Netherlands) Boy Westerhof	(Poland) Adam Chadaj (Belarus) Aliaksandr Bury	(Belgium) David Goffin (United Kingdom) Jack Carpenter (Canada) Érik Chvojka (France) Laurent Recouderc
May 30	Poland F3 Futures; Koszalin, Poland; Clay $10,000	(Belarus) Aliaksandr Bury (Belarus) Nikolai Fidirko; 1–6, 6–3, [10–6]	(Poland) Andriej Kapaś (Poland) Błażej Koniusz	(Poland) Adam Chadaj (Belarus) Aliaksandr Bury	(Belgium) David Goffin (United Kingdom) Jack Carpenter (Canada) Érik Chvojka (France) Laurent Recouderc
May 30	Romania F2 Futures; Bacău, Romania; Clay $10,000	(Romania) Victor Ioniță; 7–6^{(7–4)}, 4–0 ret.	(Italy) Thomas Fabbiano	(Spain) Gerard Granollers (Moldova) Radu Albot	(Italy) Federico Torresi (Romania) Petru-Alexandru Luncanu (Germany) Stephan Hoiss (Spain) Ignacio Coll Riudavets
May 30	Romania F2 Futures; Bacău, Romania; Clay $10,000	(Ukraine) Gleb Alekseenko (Romania) Alexandru-Daniel Carpen; 6–4, 2–6, [12–10]	(Romania) Victor Ioniță (Romania) Gabriel Moraru	(Spain) Gerard Granollers (Moldova) Radu Albot	(Italy) Federico Torresi (Romania) Petru-Alexandru Luncanu (Germany) Stephan Hoiss (Spain) Ignacio Coll Riudavets
May 30	Spain F18 Futures; Madrid, Spain; Hard $10,000	(Spain) Arnau Brugués Davi; 7–5, 6–7^{(3–7)}, 7–6^{(7–0)}	(Republic of Ireland) James McGee	(United States) Phillip Simmonds (Spain) Carles Poch Gradin	(Spain) Carlos Gómez-Herrera (Bolivia) Federico Zeballos (Spain) Javier Pulgar-García (Germany) David Thurner
May 30	Spain F18 Futures; Madrid, Spain; Hard $10,000	(China) Qi Xiao (China) Wang Yingzheng; 6–3, 6–4	(Spain) Arnau Brugués Davi (Spain) Israel Vior-Díaz	(United States) Phillip Simmonds (Spain) Carles Poch Gradin	(Spain) Carlos Gómez-Herrera (Bolivia) Federico Zeballos (Spain) Javier Pulgar-García (Germany) David Thurner
May 30	Uzbekistan F2 Futures; Namangan, Uzbekistan; Hard $15,000	(South Africa) Raven Klaasen; 6–3, 4–6, 6–2	(Russia) Mikhail Vasiliev	(Switzerland) Adrien Bossel (Russia) Ervand Gasparyan	(Uzbekistan) Murad Inoyatov (New Zealand) Michael Venus (Belgium) Julien Dubail (Russia) Alexander Rumyantsev
May 30	Uzbekistan F2 Futures; Namangan, Uzbekistan; Hard $15,000	(South Africa) Raven Klaasen (New Zealand) Michael Venus; 6–1, 6–1	(Russia) Alexander Rumyantsev (Russia) Andrei Vasilevski	(Switzerland) Adrien Bossel (Russia) Ervand Gasparyan	(Uzbekistan) Murad Inoyatov (New Zealand) Michael Venus (Belgium) Julien Dubail (Russia) Alexander Rumyantsev

== June ==
Week of	Tournament	Winner	Runners-up	Semifinalists	Quarterfinalists
June 6	Argentina F6 Futures; Posadas, Argentina; Clay $10,000	(Argentina) Kevin Konfederak; 6–4, 2–6, 7–5	(Argentina) Guillermo Durán	(Argentina) Cristián Benedetti (Argentina) Joaquín-Jesús Monteferrario	(Argentina) Juan-Pablo Amado (Argentina) Gabriel Hidalgo (Peru) Sergio Galdós (Argentina) Diego Schwartzman
June 6	Argentina F6 Futures; Posadas, Argentina; Clay $10,000	(Argentina) Guillermo Durán (Argentina) Joaquín-Jesús Monteferrario; 6–4, 7–6^{(7–4)}	(Argentina) Federico Coria (Argentina) Renzo Olivo	(Argentina) Cristián Benedetti (Argentina) Joaquín-Jesús Monteferrario	(Argentina) Juan-Pablo Amado (Argentina) Gabriel Hidalgo (Peru) Sergio Galdós (Argentina) Diego Schwartzman
June 6	Brazil F17 Futures; Curitiba, Brazil; Clay $10,000	(Argentina) Guido Andreozzi; 6–1, 4–6, 6–3	(Brazil) Tiago Lopes	(Brazil) Eládio Ribeiro Neto (Brazil) Danilo Ferraz	(Brazil) Nicolás Santos (Brazil) Rodrigo Guidolin (Argentina) Juan Vazquez-Valenzuela (Brazil) Eduardo Dischinger
June 6	Brazil F17 Futures; Curitiba, Brazil; Clay $10,000	(Brazil) Diego Matos (Brazil) André Miele; 6–2, 7–6^{(7–5)}	(Brazil) André Ghem (Brazil) Rodrigo Guidolin	(Brazil) Eládio Ribeiro Neto (Brazil) Danilo Ferraz	(Brazil) Nicolás Santos (Brazil) Rodrigo Guidolin (Argentina) Juan Vazquez-Valenzuela (Brazil) Eduardo Dischinger
June 6	China F7 Futures; Shenzhen, China; Hard $15,000	(China) Zhang Ze; 6–4, 6–2	(South Korea) An Jae-sung	(China) Gong Maoxin (Chinese Taipei) Chen Ti	(South Korea) Jun Woong-sun (China) Wu Di (South Korea) Noh Sang-woo (South Korea) Kim Dylan Seong-kwan
June 6	China F7 Futures; Shenzhen, China; Hard $15,000	(China) Gong Maoxin (China) Li Zhe; 6–0, 6–3	(South Korea) Jun Woong-sun (South Korea) Daniel Yoo	(China) Gong Maoxin (Chinese Taipei) Chen Ti	(South Korea) Jun Woong-sun (China) Wu Di (South Korea) Noh Sang-woo (South Korea) Kim Dylan Seong-kwan
June 6	India F8 Futures; Delhi, India; Hard $10,000	(India) Karunuday Singh; 6–4, 6–2	(India) Vijayant Malik	(India) Vijay Sundar Prashanth (Sweden) Patrik Rosenholm	(India) Yuki Bhambri (Russia) Vitali Reshetnikov (India) Ranjeet Virali-Murugesan (India) Vignesh Peranamallur
June 6	India F8 Futures; Delhi, India; Hard $10,000	(Russia) Vitali Reshetnikov (India) Karunuday Singh; 5–7, 6–2, [10–4]	(India) Vijay Sundar Prashanth (India) Arun-Prakash Rajagopalan	(India) Vijay Sundar Prashanth (Sweden) Patrik Rosenholm	(India) Yuki Bhambri (Russia) Vitali Reshetnikov (India) Ranjeet Virali-Murugesan (India) Vignesh Peranamallur
June 6	Indonesia F3 Futures; Jakarta, Indonesia; Hard $10,000	(Indonesia) Christopher Rungkat; 6–3, 6–2	(Japan) Kento Takeuchi	(Chinese Taipei) Huang Liang-chi (Indonesia) Sunu-Wahyu Trijati	(Indonesia) Aditya Hari Sasongko (Canada) Kelsey Stevenson (Thailand) Nuttanon Kadchapanan (Indonesia) Ryan Tanujoyo
June 6	Indonesia F3 Futures; Jakarta, Indonesia; Hard $10,000	(Thailand) Weerapat Doakmaiklee (Indonesia) Christopher Rungkat; 7–5, 6–0	(Indonesia) David Agung Susanto (Indonesia) Sunu-Wahyu Trijati	(Chinese Taipei) Huang Liang-chi (Indonesia) Sunu-Wahyu Trijati	(Indonesia) Aditya Hari Sasongko (Canada) Kelsey Stevenson (Thailand) Nuttanon Kadchapanan (Indonesia) Ryan Tanujoyo
June 6	Iran F2 Futures; Tehran, Iran; Clay $15,000	(Italy) Matteo Marrai; 6–2, 6–3	(Russia) Ivan Nedelko	(Greece) Paris Gemouchidis (Slovakia) Kamil Čapkovic	(Iran) Shahin Khaledan (Russia) Stanislav Vovk (Germany) Alex Satschko (Syria) Bruno Abdel Nour
June 6	Iran F2 Futures; Tehran, Iran; Clay $15,000	(Italy) Matteo Marrai (Germany) Alex Satschko; 6–2, 6–4	(Greece) Paris Gemouchidis (Russia) Ivan Nedelko	(Greece) Paris Gemouchidis (Slovakia) Kamil Čapkovic	(Iran) Shahin Khaledan (Russia) Stanislav Vovk (Germany) Alex Satschko (Syria) Bruno Abdel Nour
June 6	Italy F13 Futures; Parma, Italy; Clay $15,000	(Italy) Matteo Trevisan; 6–3, 6–4	(Italy) Gianluca Naso	(Germany) Marcel Zimmermann (Italy) Alberto Brizzi	(Italy) Alessandro Giannessi (Italy) Stefano Galvani (Italy) Luca Vanni (Italy) Riccardo Sinicropi
June 6	Italy F13 Futures; Parma, Italy; Clay $15,000	(Argentina) Juan-Martín Aranguren (Argentina) Alejandro Fabbri; 6–4, 7–6^{(7–5)}	(Italy) Omar Giacalone (Italy) Gianluca Naso	(Germany) Marcel Zimmermann (Italy) Alberto Brizzi	(Italy) Alessandro Giannessi (Italy) Stefano Galvani (Italy) Luca Vanni (Italy) Riccardo Sinicropi
June 6	Japan F5 Futures; Karuizawa, Japan; Clay $10,000	(Japan) Hiroyasu Ehara; 7–6^{(7–5)}, 3–6, 7–6^{(7–2)}	(Japan) Junn Mitsuhashi	(Japan) Yasutaka Uchiyama (Japan) Arata Onozawa	(Japan) Yuki Matsuo (Japan) Takuto Niki (Chinese Taipei) Lee Hsin-han (Japan) Bumpei Sato
June 6	Japan F5 Futures; Karuizawa, Japan; Clay $10,000	(Chinese Taipei) Lee Hsin-han (Japan) Bumpei Sato; 6–4, 5–7, [12–10]	(Japan) Junn Mitsuhashi (Japan) Yasutaka Uchiyama	(Japan) Yasutaka Uchiyama (Japan) Arata Onozawa	(Japan) Yuki Matsuo (Japan) Takuto Niki (Chinese Taipei) Lee Hsin-han (Japan) Bumpei Sato
June 6	Mexico F6 Futures; Puebla, Mexico; Hard $10,000	(Moldova) Roman Borvanov; 4–6, 7–5, 6–4	(Uruguay) Marcel Felder	(Mexico) Daniel Garza (El Salvador) Marcelo Arévalo	(United States) Chris Kwon (Mexico) Manuel Sánchez (Mexico) Daniel Fernández (New Zealand) Artem Sitak
June 6	Mexico F6 Futures; Puebla, Mexico; Hard $10,000	(Colombia) Nicolás Barrientos (Mexico) Manuel Sánchez; 6–3, 6–3	(Mexico) Daniel Garza (Mexico) Gustavo Loza	(Mexico) Daniel Garza (El Salvador) Marcelo Arévalo	(United States) Chris Kwon (Mexico) Manuel Sánchez (Mexico) Daniel Fernández (New Zealand) Artem Sitak
June 6	Netherlands F1 Futures; Almere, Netherlands; Clay $15,000	(Belgium) Maxime Authom; 6–2, 6–2	(Argentina) Pablo Galdón	(Belgium) Yannick Mertens (Brazil) Fernando Romboli	(France) Grégoire Burquier (Netherlands) Boy Westerhof (Belgium) Germain Gigounon (Finland) Timo Nieminen
June 6	Netherlands F1 Futures; Almere, Netherlands; Clay $15,000	(Netherlands) Antal van der Duim (Netherlands) Tim van Terheijden; 6–4, 6–3	(Argentina) Pablo Galdón (Brazil) Fernando Romboli	(Belgium) Yannick Mertens (Brazil) Fernando Romboli	(France) Grégoire Burquier (Netherlands) Boy Westerhof (Belgium) Germain Gigounon (Finland) Timo Nieminen
June 6	Poland F4 Futures; Bytom, Poland; Clay $15,000	(Australia) James Duckworth; 6–3, 3–6, 6–4	(Germany) Peter Torebko	(Poland) Grzegorz Panfil (Spain) Adrián Menéndez	(Slovakia) Pavol Červenák (Czech Republic) Roman Vögeli (Poland) Marcin Gawron (Czech Republic) Roman Jebavý
June 6	Poland F4 Futures; Bytom, Poland; Clay $15,000	(Poland) Andriej Kapaś (Poland) Błażej Koniusz; 7–5, 6–4	(Canada) Érik Chvojka (Czech Republic) Roman Jebavý	(Poland) Grzegorz Panfil (Spain) Adrián Menéndez	(Slovakia) Pavol Červenák (Czech Republic) Roman Vögeli (Poland) Marcin Gawron (Czech Republic) Roman Jebavý
June 6	Romania F3 Futures; Craiova, Romania; Clay $10,000	(Spain) Gerard Granollers; 6–4, 6–4	(Romania) Petru-Alexandru Luncanu	(Romania) Victor Ioniță (Romania) Robert Coman	(Spain) Ignacio Coll Riudavets (Romania) Andrei Dăescu (Romania) Teodor Nicolae Marin (Italy) Thomas Fabbiano
June 6	Romania F3 Futures; Craiova, Romania; Clay $10,000	(Romania) Teodor-Dacian Crăciun (Romania) Andrei Dăescu; 2–6, 7–6^{(7–0)}, [10–8]	(Spain) Ignacio Coll Riudavets (Spain) Gerard Granollers	(Romania) Victor Ioniță (Romania) Robert Coman	(Spain) Ignacio Coll Riudavets (Romania) Andrei Dăescu (Romania) Teodor Nicolae Marin (Italy) Thomas Fabbiano
June 6	USA F13 Futures; Sacramento, United States; Hard $15,000	(United States) Daniel Kosakowski; 6–4, 2–6, 6–3	(United States) Steve Johnson	(Chinese Taipei) Jimmy Wang (France) Antoine Benneteau	(Canada) Philip Bester (Spain) Guillermo Gómez-Díaz (United States) Michael Yani (United States) Greg Ouellette
June 6	USA F13 Futures; Sacramento, United States; Hard $15,000	(United States) Sekou Bangoura (France) Alexandre Lacroix; 6–4, 7–6^{(7–3)}	(United States) James Ludlow (United States) Ty Trombetta	(Chinese Taipei) Jimmy Wang (France) Antoine Benneteau	(Canada) Philip Bester (Spain) Guillermo Gómez-Díaz (United States) Michael Yani (United States) Greg Ouellette
June 13	Argentina F7 Futures; Obera, Argentina; Clay $10,000	(Argentina) Juan-Pablo Amado; 4–6, 6–4, 6–4	(Argentina) Diego Schwartzman	(Argentina) Guillermo Durán (Brazil) Guilherme Clézar	(Argentina) Patricio Heras (Argentina) Guido Pella (Peru) Duilio Beretta (Argentina) Kevin Konfederak
June 13	Argentina F7 Futures; Obera, Argentina; Clay $10,000	(Argentina) Guillermo Durán (Argentina) Patricio Heras; 6–1, 7–6^{(7–4)}	(Argentina) Juan Ignacio Londero (Argentina) Nicolás Pastor	(Argentina) Guillermo Durán (Brazil) Guilherme Clézar	(Argentina) Patricio Heras (Argentina) Guido Pella (Peru) Duilio Beretta (Argentina) Kevin Konfederak
June 13	China F8 Futures; Huizhou, China; Hard $15,000	(South Korea) Lim Yong-kyu; 6–7^{(6–8)}, 6–4, 6–1	(China) Gong Maoxin	(Thailand) Kittiphong Wachiramanowong (South Korea) Jun Woong-sun	(China) Li Zhe (China) Chang Yu (China) Wu Di (South Korea) An Jae-sung
June 13	China F8 Futures; Huizhou, China; Hard $15,000	(China) Gong Maoxin (China) Li Zhe; 6–4, 6–2	(China) Gao Peng (China) Gao Wan	(Thailand) Kittiphong Wachiramanowong (South Korea) Jun Woong-sun	(China) Li Zhe (China) Chang Yu (China) Wu Di (South Korea) An Jae-sung
June 13	France F8 Futures; Blois, France; Clay $15,000+H	(Argentina) Martín Alund; 6–4, 6–7^{(6–8)}, 6–3	(France) Nicolas Renavand	(France) Florian Reynet (France) Mathias Bourgue	(France) Nicolas Devilder (Serbia) Miljan Zekić (France) Gianni Mina (France) Julien Obry
June 13	France F8 Futures; Blois, France; Clay $15,000+H	(France) Pierre-Hugues Herbert (France) Nicolas Renavand; 3–6, 6–4, [10–8]	(Argentina) Martín Alund (Argentina) Guillermo Bujniewicz	(France) Florian Reynet (France) Mathias Bourgue	(France) Nicolas Devilder (Serbia) Miljan Zekić (France) Gianni Mina (France) Julien Obry
June 13	Germany F5 Futures; Cologne, Germany; Clay $10,000	(Germany) Holger Fischer; 6–2, 6–1	(Australia) Matt Reid	(Germany) Florian Fallert (Chile) Hans Podlipnik Castillo	(Germany) Kevin Krawietz (Republic of Ireland) Louk Sorensen (Germany) Dennis Blömke (Russia) Alexey Vatutin
June 13	Germany F5 Futures; Cologne, Germany; Clay $10,000	(Germany) Dennis Blömke (Germany) Peter Steinberger; 6–1, 7–5	(France) Jérôme Inzerillo (Colombia) Sebastián Serrano	(Germany) Florian Fallert (Chile) Hans Podlipnik Castillo	(Germany) Kevin Krawietz (Republic of Ireland) Louk Sorensen (Germany) Dennis Blömke (Russia) Alexey Vatutin
June 13	Italy F14 Futures; Padova, Italy; Clay $15,000	(Austria) Philipp Oswald; 6–4, 6–3	(Spain) Gerard Granollers Pujol	(Germany) Marcel Zimmermann (Switzerland) Michael Lammer	(Italy) Luca Vanni (Lithuania) Laurynas Grigelis (Sweden) Patrik Brydolf (Italy) Alessandro Giannessi
June 13	Italy F14 Futures; Padova, Italy; Clay $15,000	(Argentina) Guillermo Carry (Slovenia) Andrej Kračman; 7–5, 7–5	(Russia) Mikhail Vasiliev (United States) Denis Zivkovic	(Germany) Marcel Zimmermann (Switzerland) Michael Lammer	(Italy) Luca Vanni (Lithuania) Laurynas Grigelis (Sweden) Patrik Brydolf (Italy) Alessandro Giannessi
June 13	Japan F6 Futures; Kashiwa, Japan; Hard $10,000	(Japan) Junn Mitsuhashi; 6–4, 6–0	(Japan) Hiroki Moriya	(Japan) Arata Onozawa (Japan) Bumpei Sato	(Japan) Shuichi Sekiguchi (Chinese Taipei) Lee Hsin-han (Japan) Takuto Niki (Japan) Toshihide Matsui
June 13	Japan F6 Futures; Kashiwa, Japan; Hard $10,000	(Indonesia) Christopher Rungkat (Chinese Taipei) Yi Chu-huan; 7–6^{(7–2)}, 6–3	(Chinese Taipei) Hsieh Cheng-peng (Chinese Taipei) Lee Hsin-han	(Japan) Arata Onozawa (Japan) Bumpei Sato	(Japan) Shuichi Sekiguchi (Chinese Taipei) Lee Hsin-han (Japan) Takuto Niki (Japan) Toshihide Matsui
June 13	Mexico F7 Futures; Morelia, Mexico; Hard $10,000	(Uruguay) Marcel Felder; 2–6, 6–4, 6–4	(New Zealand) Artem Sitak	(Moldova) Roman Borvanov (Mexico) Daniel Garza	(United States) Chris Kwon (Colombia) Nicolás Barrientos (Haiti) Olivier Sajous (El Salvador) Marcelo Arévalo
June 13	Mexico F7 Futures; Morelia, Mexico; Hard $10,000	(New Zealand) Marcus Daniell (New Zealand) Artem Sitak; 6–0, 6–3	(Philippines) Ruben Gonzales (United States) Chris Kwon	(Moldova) Roman Borvanov (Mexico) Daniel Garza	(United States) Chris Kwon (Colombia) Nicolás Barrientos (Haiti) Olivier Sajous (El Salvador) Marcelo Arévalo
June 13	Netherlands F2 Futures; Alkmaar, Netherlands; Clay $15,000	(Spain) Íñigo Cervantes Huegun; 6–3, 4–6, 6–0	(Belgium) Maxime Authom	(Netherlands) Antal van der Duim (Australia) Brydan Klein	(Australia) Ben Wagland (Belarus) Siarhei Betau (Russia) Victor Baluda (Austria) Gerald Melzer
June 13	Netherlands F2 Futures; Alkmaar, Netherlands; Clay $15,000	(Spain) Íñigo Cervantes Huegun (Argentina) Pablo Galdón; 6–0, 7–6^{(7–3)}	(Finland) Timo Nieminen (Finland) Juho Paukku	(Netherlands) Antal van der Duim (Australia) Brydan Klein	(Australia) Ben Wagland (Belarus) Siarhei Betau (Russia) Victor Baluda (Austria) Gerald Melzer
June 13	Serbia F1 Futures; Belgrade, Serbia; Clay $10,000	(Serbia) Nikola Ćaćić; 6–3, 6–0	(France) Axel Michon	(Slovenia) Andraž Bedene (Montenegro) Goran Tošić	(Slovakia) Kamil Čapkovic (Austria) Nicolas Reissig (Czech Republic) Roman Jebavý (Belgium) Arthur De Greef
June 13	Serbia F1 Futures; Belgrade, Serbia; Clay $10,000	(Serbia) Nikola Ćaćić (Montenegro) Goran Tošić; 6–0, 3–6, [10–7]	(Montenegro) Nemanja Kontić (Serbia) Arsenije Zlatanović	(Slovenia) Andraž Bedene (Montenegro) Goran Tošić	(Slovakia) Kamil Čapkovic (Austria) Nicolas Reissig (Czech Republic) Roman Jebavý (Belgium) Arthur De Greef
June 13	Spain F20 Futures; Martos, Spain; Hard $15,000	(Spain) Arnau Brugués Davi; 6–2, 6–3	(Spain) Andrés Artuñedo	(Australia) Michael Look (Russia) Ilya Belyaev	(Spain) Carlos Gómez-Herrera (Spain) Ricardo Ojeda Lara (Ukraine) Denys Molchanov (Spain) Miguel Ángel López Jaén
June 13	Spain F20 Futures; Martos, Spain; Hard $15,000	(Finland) Harri Heliövaara (Ukraine) Denys Molchanov; 6–3, 6–4	(Russia) Ilya Belyaev (Canada) Steven Diez	(Australia) Michael Look (Russia) Ilya Belyaev	(Spain) Carlos Gómez-Herrera (Spain) Ricardo Ojeda Lara (Ukraine) Denys Molchanov (Spain) Miguel Ángel López Jaén
June 13	USA F14 Futures; Chico, USA; Hard $15,000	(Canada) Philip Bester; 6–4, 6–2	(United States) Blake Strode	(United States) Devin Britton (United States) Daniel Kosakowski	(United States) Joshua Zavala (Czech Republic) Rudolf Siwy (Bulgaria) Dimitar Kutrovsky (United States) Greg Ouellette
June 13	USA F14 Futures; Chico, USA; Hard $15,000	(United States) Vahe Assadourian (Chinese Taipei) Jimmy Wang; 6–4, 6–4	(United Kingdom) Edward Corrie (United States) Trevor Dobson	(United States) Devin Britton (United States) Daniel Kosakowski	(United States) Joshua Zavala (Czech Republic) Rudolf Siwy (Bulgaria) Dimitar Kutrovsky (United States) Greg Ouellette
June 13	Venezuela F4 Futures; Maracaibo, Venezuela; Hard $10,000	(Colombia) Eduardo Struvay; 6–4, 3–6, 7–6^{(12–10)}	(Australia) John Peers	(Venezuela) Jesús Bandrés (Argentina) Guido Andreozzi	(Venezuela) Luis David Martínez (United States) Peter Aarts (Venezuela) Román Recarte (Colombia) Felipe Mantilla
June 13	Venezuela F4 Futures; Maracaibo, Venezuela; Hard $10,000	(Venezuela) Roberto Maytín (Australia) John Peers; 6–2, 6–1	(United States) Peter Aarts (Australia) Chris Letcher	(Venezuela) Jesús Bandrés (Argentina) Guido Andreozzi	(Venezuela) Luis David Martínez (United States) Peter Aarts (Venezuela) Román Recarte (Colombia) Felipe Mantilla
June 20	Argentina F8 Futures; Corrientes, Argentina; Clay $10,000	(Argentina) Facundo Argüello; 3–6, 6–2, 7–6^{(7–4)}	(Peru) Duilio Beretta	(Argentina) Guido Pella (Argentina) Renzo Olivo	(Argentina) Agustín Velotti (Brazil) Rodrigo Guidolin (Uruguay) Martín Cuevas (Argentina) Diego Schwartzman
June 20	Argentina F8 Futures; Corrientes, Argentina; Clay $10,000	(Brazil) Guilherme Clézar (Brazil) Rodrigo Guidolin; 4–6, 7–5, [10–8]	(Argentina) Joaquín-Jesús Monteferrario (Argentina) Renzo Olivo	(Argentina) Guido Pella (Argentina) Renzo Olivo	(Argentina) Agustín Velotti (Brazil) Rodrigo Guidolin (Uruguay) Martín Cuevas (Argentina) Diego Schwartzman
June 20	Chile F4 Futures; Arica, Chile; Clay $10,000	(Chile) Cristóbal Saavedra Corvalán; 5–4 ret.	(Chile) Guillermo Rivera Aránguiz	(Chile) Nicolás Gustavo Kauer (Argentina) Gastón-Arturo Grimolizzi	(Chile) Rodrigo Pérez (Ecuador) Juan Sebastián Vivanco (Brazil) Bruno Semenzato (Chile) Javier Muñoz
June 20	Chile F4 Futures; Arica, Chile; Clay $10,000	(Argentina) Gastón-Arturo Grimolizzi (Peru) Iván Miranda; 7–5, 6–4	(Argentina) Raúl Guardia (Bolivia) Federico Zeballos	(Chile) Nicolás Gustavo Kauer (Argentina) Gastón-Arturo Grimolizzi	(Chile) Rodrigo Pérez (Ecuador) Juan Sebastián Vivanco (Brazil) Bruno Semenzato (Chile) Javier Muñoz
June 20	France F9 Futures; Toulon, France; Clay $15,000	(France) Gianni Mina; 7–6^{(7–4)}, 6–4	(Serbia) Miljan Zekić	(France) Jonathan Eysseric (Monaco) Benjamin Balleret	(France) Jonathan Dasnières de Veigy (France) Clément Reix (France) Charles-Antoine Brézac (Germany) Sami Reinwein
June 20	France F9 Futures; Toulon, France; Clay $15,000	(France) Jonathan Eysseric (France) Fabrice Martin; 6–3, 7–6^{(7–2)}	(France) Julien Obry (France) Adrien Puget	(France) Jonathan Eysseric (Monaco) Benjamin Balleret	(France) Jonathan Dasnières de Veigy (France) Clément Reix (France) Charles-Antoine Brézac (Germany) Sami Reinwein
June 20	Germany F6 Futures; Trier, Germany; Clay $10,000	(Germany) Marc Sieber; 6–2, 4–6, 6–4	(Germany) Peter Gojowczyk	(Belgium) Yannick Vandenbulcke (Netherlands) Nick van der Meer	(Belgium) Yannik Reuter (United Kingdom) Alexander Slabinsky (Sweden) Carl Bergman (Germany) Jean Zietsman
June 20	Germany F6 Futures; Trier, Germany; Clay $10,000	(Sweden) Carl Bergman (Finland) Juho Paukku; 6–4, 6–1	(Germany) Peter Gojowczyk (Germany) Marc Sieber	(Belgium) Yannick Vandenbulcke (Netherlands) Nick van der Meer	(Belgium) Yannik Reuter (United Kingdom) Alexander Slabinsky (Sweden) Carl Bergman (Germany) Jean Zietsman
June 20	Italy F15 Futures; Viterbo, Italy; Clay $10,000	(Italy) Alessandro Giannessi; 6–3, 6–0	(Slovenia) Janez Semrajc	(Italy) Luca Vanni (Italy) Claudio Grassi	(Italy) Enrico Fiovarante (Italy) Claudio Fortuna (Egypt) Karim Maamoun (Brazil) Thales Turini
June 20	Italy F15 Futures; Viterbo, Italy; Clay $10,000	(Sweden) Patrik Brydolf (Poland) Adam Chadaj; 6–2, 1–6, [10–8]	(Italy) Federico Torresi (Italy) Luca Vanni	(Italy) Luca Vanni (Italy) Claudio Grassi	(Italy) Enrico Fiovarante (Italy) Claudio Fortuna (Egypt) Karim Maamoun (Brazil) Thales Turini
June 20	Japan F7 Futures; Akishima, Japan; Grass $10,000	(Japan) Takuto Niki; 6–2, 6–4	(Japan) Hiroki Kondo	(Japan) Shuichi Sekiguchi (Japan) Hiroki Moriya	(Japan) Yuichi Ito (United Kingdom) Andrew Fitzpatrick (Japan) Keita Koyama (Chinese Taipei) Lee Hsin-han
June 20	Japan F7 Futures; Akishima, Japan; Grass $10,000	(Indonesia) Christopher Rungkat (Chinese Taipei) Yi Chu-huan; 6–4, 6–3	(Chinese Taipei) Hsieh Cheng-peng (Chinese Taipei) Lee Hsin-han	(Japan) Shuichi Sekiguchi (Japan) Hiroki Moriya	(Japan) Yuichi Ito (United Kingdom) Andrew Fitzpatrick (Japan) Keita Koyama (Chinese Taipei) Lee Hsin-han
June 20	Morocco F4 Futures; Casablanca, Morocco; Clay $15,000	(Italy) Matteo Viola; 6–1, 6–4	(Switzerland) Michael Lammer	(Canada) Steven Diez (Austria) Gerald Melzer	(Spain) Roberto Carballés (Spain) Jordi Samper Montaña (Slovakia) Jozef Kovalík (France) Florent Diep
June 20	Morocco F4 Futures; Casablanca, Morocco; Clay $15,000	(Czech Republic) Michal Konečný (Slovakia) Jozef Kovalík; 6–1, 6–3	(Switzerland) Michael Lammer (Russia) Mikhail Vasiliev	(Canada) Steven Diez (Austria) Gerald Melzer	(Spain) Roberto Carballés (Spain) Jordi Samper Montaña (Slovakia) Jozef Kovalík (France) Florent Diep
June 20	Netherlands F3 Futures; Breda, Netherlands; Clay $15,000+H	(Argentina) Pablo Galdón; 6–3, 6–3	(Chile) Jorge Aguilar	(Netherlands) Antal van der Duim (Germany) Bastian Knittel	(Uzbekistan) Farrukh Dustov (Australia) James Lemke (Slovenia) Blaž Rola (Netherlands) Matwé Middelkoop
June 20	Netherlands F3 Futures; Breda, Netherlands; Clay $15,000+H	(Netherlands) Antal van der Duim (Netherlands) Tim van Terheijden; 6–4, 5–7, [10–1]	(Germany) Bastian Knittel (Germany) Alex Satschko	(Netherlands) Antal van der Duim (Germany) Bastian Knittel	(Uzbekistan) Farrukh Dustov (Australia) James Lemke (Slovenia) Blaž Rola (Netherlands) Matwé Middelkoop
June 20	Serbia F2 Futures; Belgrade, Serbia; Clay $10,000	(France) Axel Michon; 7–6^{(10–8)}, 4–6, 7–5	(Bosnia and Herzegovina) Damir Džumhur	(Serbia) Nikola Ćaćić (Austria) Marc Rath	(Australia) Matt Reid (Belgium) Arthur De Greef (Croatia) Roko Karanušić (Bulgaria) Dimitar Kuzmanov
June 20	Serbia F2 Futures; Belgrade, Serbia; Clay $10,000	(Bosnia and Herzegovina) Damir Džumhur (Bosnia and Herzegovina) Aldin Šetkić; 2–6, 7–6^{(7–4)}, [10–6]	(Serbia) Nikola Ćaćić (Montenegro) Goran Tošić	(Serbia) Nikola Ćaćić (Austria) Marc Rath	(Australia) Matt Reid (Belgium) Arthur De Greef (Croatia) Roko Karanušić (Bulgaria) Dimitar Kuzmanov
June 20	Spain F21 Futures; Melilla, Spain; Hard $10,000	(Australia) Benjamin Mitchell; 6–3, 6–1	(Spain) Roberto Ortega Olmedo	(Sweden) Michael Ryderstedt (France) Rudy Coco	(Australia) Michael Look (Russia) Ilya Belyaev (India) Ramkumar Ramanathan (Finland) Harri Heliövaara
June 20	Spain F21 Futures; Melilla, Spain; Hard $10,000	(Finland) Harri Heliövaara (Ukraine) Denys Molchanov; 6–2, 7–6^{(7–2)}	(Spain) Jaime Pulgar-García (Spain) Javier Pulgar-García	(Sweden) Michael Ryderstedt (France) Rudy Coco	(Australia) Michael Look (Russia) Ilya Belyaev (India) Ramkumar Ramanathan (Finland) Harri Heliövaara
June 20	USA F15 Futures; Indian Harbour Beach, USA; Hard $10,000	(United States) Jesse Levine; 6–4, 6–4	(United States) Jeff Dadamo	(Belarus) Kiryl Harbatsiuk (United States) Ty Trombetta	(United States) Austin Krajicek (Russia) Artem Ilyushin (United States) Robbye Poole (Australia) John-Patrick Smith
June 20	USA F15 Futures; Indian Harbour Beach, USA; Hard $10,000	(Malaysia) Mohd Assri Merzuki (Romania) Gabriel Moraru; 7–6^{(8–6)}, 3–6, [10–7]	(France) Antoine Benneteau (Russia) Artem Ilyushin	(Belarus) Kiryl Harbatsiuk (United States) Ty Trombetta	(United States) Austin Krajicek (Russia) Artem Ilyushin (United States) Robbye Poole (Australia) John-Patrick Smith
June 20	Venezuela F5 Futures; Coro, Venezuela; Hard $10,000	(Venezuela) Román Recarte; 6–3, 1–6, 6–1	(Argentina) Guido Andreozzi	(Venezuela) Jesús Bandrés (Argentina) Cristián Benedetti	(Colombia) Eduardo Struvay (Uruguay) Ariel Behar (Venezuela) Roberto Maytín (Brazil) Marlon Oliveira
June 20	Venezuela F5 Futures; Coro, Venezuela; Hard $10,000	(Venezuela) Piero Luisi (Venezuela) Román Recarte; 6–4, 6–3	(Venezuela) Roberto Maytín (Australia) John Peers	(Venezuela) Jesús Bandrés (Argentina) Cristián Benedetti	(Colombia) Eduardo Struvay (Uruguay) Ariel Behar (Venezuela) Roberto Maytín (Brazil) Marlon Oliveira
June 27	Argentina F9 Futures; Chaco, Argentina; Clay $10,000	(Argentina) Facundo Argüello; 6–4, 6–2	(Argentina) Guillermo Durán	(Argentina) Nicolás Pastor (Argentina) Kevin Konfederak	(Argentina) Agustín Velotti (Argentina) Valentín Florez (Argentina) Renzo Olivo (Argentina) Juan Ignacio Londero
June 27	Argentina F9 Futures; Chaco, Argentina; Clay $10,000	(Argentina) Valentín Florez (Bolivia) Ryusei Makiguchi; 6–1, 6–1	(Argentina) Andrés Ceppo (Argentina) José María Paniagua	(Argentina) Nicolás Pastor (Argentina) Kevin Konfederak	(Argentina) Agustín Velotti (Argentina) Valentín Florez (Argentina) Renzo Olivo (Argentina) Juan Ignacio Londero
June 27	Brazil F19 Futures; Manaus, Brazil; Clay (indoor) $10,000	(Brazil) Fabiano de Paula; 6–1, 1–6, 6–3	(Sweden) Christian Lindell	(Brazil) Diego Matos (Brazil) André Miele	(Italy) Alessandro Bega (Brazil) Tiago Lopes (Brazil) André Baran (Brazil) Gabriel Vicentini Pereira
June 27	Brazil F19 Futures; Manaus, Brazil; Clay (indoor) $10,000	(Sweden) Christian Lindell (Brazil) Tiago Lopes; 7–5, 6–1	(Brazil) Diego Matos (Brazil) André Miele	(Brazil) Diego Matos (Brazil) André Miele	(Italy) Alessandro Bega (Brazil) Tiago Lopes (Brazil) André Baran (Brazil) Gabriel Vicentini Pereira
June 27	Chile F5 Futures; Iquique, Chile; Clay $10,000	(Argentina) Gastón-Arturo Grimolizzi; 6–4, 6–2	(Paraguay) Daniel-Alejandro López	(Chile) Javier Muñoz (Ecuador) Juan Sebastián Vivanco	(Argentina) Facundo Mena (Argentina) Federico Coria (Peru) Iván Miranda (Argentina) Matías Salinas
June 27	Chile F5 Futures; Iquique, Chile; Clay $10,000	(Argentina) Patricio Heras (Argentina) Gustavo Sterin; 6–4, 7–6^{(7–4)}	(Argentina) Federico Coria (Argentina) Facundo Mena	(Chile) Javier Muñoz (Ecuador) Juan Sebastián Vivanco	(Argentina) Facundo Mena (Argentina) Federico Coria (Peru) Iván Miranda (Argentina) Matías Salinas
June 27	France F10 Futures; Montauban, France; Clay $15,000+H	(Chile) Jorge Aguilar; 7–6^{(7–4)}, 6–4	(France) Kenny de Schepper	(France) Alexandre Sidorenko (France) Romain Jouan	(France) Maxime Teixeira (France) Nicolas Renavand (Australia) Colin Ebelthite (France) Olivier Patience
June 27	France F10 Futures; Montauban, France; Clay $15,000+H	(France) Pierre-Hugues Herbert (France) Nicolas Renavand; 6–4, 6–4	(France) Fabrice Martin (France) Alexandre Sidorenko	(France) Alexandre Sidorenko (France) Romain Jouan	(France) Maxime Teixeira (France) Nicolas Renavand (Australia) Colin Ebelthite (France) Olivier Patience
June 27	Germany F7 Futures; Kassel, Germany; Clay $15,000+H	(Czech Republic) Dušan Lojda; 4–6, 6–0, 6–3	(Germany) Kevin Krawietz	(Croatia) Kristijan Mesaroš (Germany) Peter Gojowczyk	(Hungary) Dénes Lukács (Ukraine) Artem Smirnov (Hungary) Attila Balázs (Belarus) Siarhei Betau
June 27	Germany F7 Futures; Kassel, Germany; Clay $15,000+H	(Germany) Bastian Knittel (Germany) Alex Satschko; 7–6^{(7–3)}, 6–3	(Belarus) Siarhei Betau (Belarus) Aliaksandr Bury	(Croatia) Kristijan Mesaroš (Germany) Peter Gojowczyk	(Hungary) Dénes Lukács (Ukraine) Artem Smirnov (Hungary) Attila Balázs (Belarus) Siarhei Betau
June 27	Great Britain F8 Futures; Manchester, Great Britain; Grass $10,000	(Tunisia) Malek Jaziri; 7–6^{(7–3)}, 4–6, 6–2	(France) Rudy Coco	(United Kingdom) Sean Thornley (Finland) Henri Kontinen	(United Kingdom) Joshua Goodall (United Kingdom) Chris Eaton (United States) Blake Strode (France) Albano Olivetti
June 27	Great Britain F8 Futures; Manchester, Great Britain; Grass $10,000	(United Kingdom) Chris Eaton (United Kingdom) Joshua Goodall; 6–4, 7–6^{(7–3)}	(Tunisia) Malek Jaziri (France) Albano Olivetti	(United Kingdom) Sean Thornley (Finland) Henri Kontinen	(United Kingdom) Joshua Goodall (United Kingdom) Chris Eaton (United States) Blake Strode (France) Albano Olivetti
June 27	Italy F16 Futures; Bologna, Italy; Clay $15,000	(Italy) Daniele Giorgini; 7–6^{(7–4)}, 7–6^{(7–3)}	(Australia) James Duckworth	(Italy) Matteo Viola (Italy) Luca Vanni	(Italy) Federico Torresi (Italy) Matteo Marrai (Italy) Enrico Burzi (Italy) Nicola Ghedin
June 27	Italy F16 Futures; Bologna, Italy; Clay $15,000	(Italy) Nicola Ghedin (Italy) Marco Speronello; 5–7, 6–3, [10–3]	(Italy) Massimo Capone (Italy) Matteo Viola	(Italy) Matteo Viola (Italy) Luca Vanni	(Italy) Federico Torresi (Italy) Matteo Marrai (Italy) Enrico Burzi (Italy) Nicola Ghedin
June 27	Japan F8 Futures; Sapporo, Japan; Clay $10,000	(Japan) Junn Mitsuhashi; 7–6^{(9–7)}, 5–7, 6–4	(Japan) Hiroki Moriya	(Japan) Hiroyasu Ehara (Japan) Hiroki Kondo	(Japan) Yasutaka Uchiyama (Japan) Arata Onozawa (Chinese Taipei) Lee Hsin-han (Japan) Kishi Watanabe
June 27	Japan F8 Futures; Sapporo, Japan; Clay $10,000	(Chinese Taipei) Hsieh Cheng-peng (Chinese Taipei) Lee Hsin-han; 6–4, 3–6, [10–7]	(Japan) Bumpei Sato (Thailand) Kittiphong Wachiramanowong	(Japan) Hiroyasu Ehara (Japan) Hiroki Kondo	(Japan) Yasutaka Uchiyama (Japan) Arata Onozawa (Chinese Taipei) Lee Hsin-han (Japan) Kishi Watanabe
June 27	Morocco F5 Futures; Rabat, Morocco; Clay $15,000	(Morocco) Mehdi Ziadi; 6–4, 6–4	(Republic of Ireland) James McGee	(France) Florent Diep (Russia) Ivan Nedelko	(Spain) Carles Poch Gradin (Spain) Rafael Mazón-Hernández (France) Alexis Musialek (Russia) Mikhail Vasiliev
June 27	Morocco F5 Futures; Rabat, Morocco; Clay $15,000	(France) Florent Diep (France) Dimitri Lorin; 6–3, 7–6^{(7–5)}	(Morocco) Omar Erramy (Morocco) Yassine Idmbarek	(France) Florent Diep (Russia) Ivan Nedelko	(Spain) Carles Poch Gradin (Spain) Rafael Mazón-Hernández (France) Alexis Musialek (Russia) Mikhail Vasiliev
June 27	Netherlands F4 Futures; Middelburg, Netherlands; Clay $15,000	(Belgium) Yannick Mertens; 6–4, 6–4	(Russia) Victor Baluda	(Netherlands) Matwé Middelkoop (Germany) Peter Torebko	(Belgium) Niels Desein (Finland) Timo Nieminen (Belgium) Maxime Authom (Netherlands) Wesley Koolhof
June 27	Netherlands F4 Futures; Middelburg, Netherlands; Clay $15,000	(Netherlands) David de Goede (Netherlands) Omar van Welzenis; 3–6, 7–5, [10–7]	(Netherlands) Romano Frantzen (Netherlands) Arko Zoutendijk	(Netherlands) Matwé Middelkoop (Germany) Peter Torebko	(Belgium) Niels Desein (Finland) Timo Nieminen (Belgium) Maxime Authom (Netherlands) Wesley Koolhof
June 27	Romania F4 Futures; Mediaș, Romania; Clay $10,000	(Hungary) Ádám Kellner; 3–6, 6–0, 7–6^{(7–3)}	(Romania) Victor Ioniță	(Sweden) Markus Eriksson (Romania) Răzvan Sabău	(Greece) Theodoros Angelinos (Czech Republic) Jiří Školoudík (Czech Republic) Michal Schmid (Romania) Darius Florin Brăguși
June 27	Romania F4 Futures; Mediaș, Romania; Clay $10,000	(Sweden) Jesper Brunström (Sweden) Markus Eriksson; 6–3, 6–2	(Czech Republic) Michal Schmid (Czech Republic) Jiří Školoudík	(Sweden) Markus Eriksson (Romania) Răzvan Sabău	(Greece) Theodoros Angelinos (Czech Republic) Jiří Školoudík (Czech Republic) Michal Schmid (Romania) Darius Florin Brăguși
June 27	Serbia F3 Futures; Belgrade, Serbia; Clay $10,000	(Australia) Matt Reid; 6–0, 6–2	(Croatia) Roko Karanušić	(Serbia) Ivan Bjelica (Bosnia and Herzegovina) Damir Džumhur	(Serbia) Nikola Bubnić (Switzerland) Henri Laaksonen (Serbia) Nikola Ćaćić (France) Axel Michon
June 27	Serbia F3 Futures; Belgrade, Serbia; Clay $10,000	(Serbia) Boris Čonkić (Serbia) Dušan Vemić; 6–4, 4–6, [10–5]	(Ukraine) Vadim Alekseenko (Serbia) Petar Đukić	(Serbia) Ivan Bjelica (Bosnia and Herzegovina) Damir Džumhur	(Serbia) Nikola Bubnić (Switzerland) Henri Laaksonen (Serbia) Nikola Ćaćić (France) Axel Michon
June 27	Spain F22 Futures; Palma del Rio, Spain; Hard $15,000	(Spain) Arnau Brugués Davi; 6–1, 6–3	(Slovakia) Miloslav Mečíř Jr.	(Finland) Harri Heliövaara (France) Josselin Ouanna	(Spain) Íñigo Cervantes Huegun (Russia) Ilya Belyaev (United Kingdom) Daniel Cox (South Africa) Nikala Scholtz
June 27	Spain F22 Futures; Palma del Rio, Spain; Hard $15,000	(Spain) Juan José Leal-Gómez (Spain) Borja Rodríguez Manzano; 6–3, 3–6, [12–10]	(South Africa) Ruan Roelofse (South Africa) Nikala Scholtz	(Finland) Harri Heliövaara (France) Josselin Ouanna	(Spain) Íñigo Cervantes Huegun (Russia) Ilya Belyaev (United Kingdom) Daniel Cox (South Africa) Nikala Scholtz
June 27	USA F16 Futures; Innisbrook, USA; Clay $10,000	(United States) Rhyne Williams; 4–6, 6–2, 7–5	(Russia) Artem Ilyushin	(United States) Mitchell Frank (United States) Daniel Kosakowski	(France) Paterne Mamata (United States) Austin Krajicek (Russia) Oleg Dmitriev (United States) Robbye Poole
June 27	USA F16 Futures; Innisbrook, USA; Clay $10,000	(United States) Benjamin Rogers (Australia) John-Patrick Smith; 7–6^{(7–3)}, 6–3	(United States) Jeff Dadamo (United States) Austin Krajicek	(United States) Mitchell Frank (United States) Daniel Kosakowski	(France) Paterne Mamata (United States) Austin Krajicek (Russia) Oleg Dmitriev (United States) Robbye Poole
June 27	Venezuela F6 Futures; Caracas, Venezuela; Hard $10,000	(Australia) John Peers; 7–6^{(7–4)}, 4–6, 7–6^{(7–2)}	(Venezuela) Roberto Maytín	(Argentina) Cristián Benedetti (Colombia) Eduardo Struvay	(Argentina) Sebastián Decoud (Venezuela) Ricardo Rodríguez (Venezuela) Juan Carlos Ceballos (Venezuela) Román Recarte
June 27	Venezuela F6 Futures; Caracas, Venezuela; Hard $10,000	(Venezuela) Piero Luisi (Venezuela) Roberto Maytín; 6–4, 6–4	(Australia) John Peers (Ecuador) Roberto Quiroz	(Argentina) Cristián Benedetti (Colombia) Eduardo Struvay	(Argentina) Sebastián Decoud (Venezuela) Ricardo Rodríguez (Venezuela) Juan Carlos Ceballos (Venezuela) Román Recarte
