= 2009 Abierto Internacional de Salinas – Singles =

Singles
- 2009 Abierto Internacional de Salinas

Final
- Champion: (Colombia) Santiago Giraldo
- Runner-up: (United States) Michael Russell
- Score: 6–3, 6–2

Events
Singles	Doubles
← 2008 ·	Abierto Internacional de Salinas	· 2010 →

Iván Miranda was the defending champion; however, he lost in the second round to Benjamin Becker.
Santiago Giraldo won in the final over Michael Russell, 6–3, 6–2.

== Seeds ==
1. (Argentina) Leonardo Mayer (semifinals)
2. (Brazil) Thiago Alves (second round)
3. (Germany) Benjamin Becker (quarterfinals)
4. (Uruguay) Pablo Cuevas (first round)
5. (Denmark) Kristian Pless (second round)
6. (Colombia) Santiago Giraldo (champion)
7. (Brazil) Ricardo Hocevar (first round)
8. (Argentina) Juan Pablo Brzezicki (first round)

== Draw ==
=== Key ===
- Q = Qualifier
- WC = Wild card
- LL = Lucky loser
- Alt = Alternate
- ITF = ITF entry
- PR = Protected ranking
- SR = Special ranking
- SE = Special exempt
- JE = Junior exempt
- JR = Junior Accelerator Programme entrant
- CO = College Accelerator Programme entrant
- NG = Next Gen Accelerator Program entrant
- w/o = Walkover
- r = Retired
- d = Defaulted

=== Final four ===
Semifinals
1	(Argentina) Leonardo Mayer	5	3
(United States) Michael Russell	7	6
6	(Colombia) Santiago Giraldo	6	6
(Argentina) Carlos Berlocq	2	2

Final
(United States) Michael Russell	3	2
6	(Colombia) Santiago Giraldo	6	6

=== Top half ===
First round
1	(Argentina) L Mayer	6	6
WC	(Ecuador) JC Campozano	2	2
(Mexico) B Echagaray	6	7
(Israel) H Levy	2	5
(Brazil) C Zampieri	2	3
(Paraguay) R Delgado	6	6
Q	(Colombia) C Salamanca	4	2
5	(Denmark) K Pless	6	6
3	(Germany) B Becker	6	6
(Brazil) R Mello	2	4
WC	(United States) E Nunez	4	2
(Peru) I Miranda	6	6
(Argentina) H Zeballos	6	6
(Uruguay) M Felder	4	2
(United States) M Russell	3	6	6
7	(Brazil) R Hocevar	6	3	2

Second round
1	(Argentina) L Mayer	6	7
5	(Mexico) B Echagaray	1	6^{6}
(Paraguay) R Delgado	6	6
5	(Denmark) K Pless	3	4
3	(Germany) B Becker	6	6
(Peru) I Miranda	6^{3}	4
(Argentina) H Zeballos	2	1
(United States) M Russell	6	6

Quarterfinals
1	(Argentina) L Mayer
(Paraguay) R Delgado	w/o
3	(Germany) B Becker	3	6	2
(United States) M Russell	6	4	6

Semifinals
1	(Argentina) L Mayer	5	3
(United States) M Russell	7	6

=== Bottom half ===
First round
6	(Colombia) S Giraldo	6	7
Q	(Brazil) D Silva	2	5
(United States) T Widom	6	6
WC	(Ecuador) C Avellán	4	3
(Brazil) J Souza	4	6	6
WC	(Argentina) Alejo Apud	6	2	1
(Colombia) A Falla	6	7
4	(Uruguay) P Cuevas	3	5
8	(Argentina) JP Brzezicki	4	6	4
Q	(South Africa) I van der Merwe	3	6	3
Q	(Argentina) M González	6	3	6
(Spain) F Vicente	3	6	3
(Argentina) C Berlocq	4	6	6
(Brazil) A Miele	6	3	2
(Brazil) R Dutra da Silva	3	4
2	(Brazil) T Alves	6	6

Second round
6	(Colombia) S Giraldo	6	6
(United States) T Widom	1	6^{7}
(Brazil) J Souza	3	6^{3}
(Colombia) A Falla	6	7
Q	(South Africa) I van der Merwe	6	6
Q	(Argentina) M González	3	0
(Argentina) C Berlocq	6	6
2	(Brazil) T Alves	3	0

Quarterfinals
6	(Colombia) S Giraldo	7	6
(Colombia) A Falla	5	4
Q	(South Africa) I van der Merwe	6^{10}	3
(Argentina) C Berlocq	7	6

Semifinals
6	(Colombia) S Giraldo	6	6
(Argentina) C Berlocq	2	2
