= 2009 Abierto Internacional de Salinas – Doubles =

Doubles
- 2009 Abierto Internacional de Salinas

Final
- Champions: (Thailand) Sanchai Ratiwatana (Thailand) Sonchat Ratiwatana
- Runners-up: (Argentina) Juan Pablo Brzezicki (Peru) Iván Miranda
- Score: 6–3, 7–6(4)

Events
Singles	Doubles
← 2008 ·	Abierto Internacional de Salinas	· 2010 →

Sanchai Ratiwatana and Sonchat Ratiwatana won in the final 6–3, 7–6(4), against Juan Pablo Brzezicki and Iván Miranda.

== Seeds ==
1. (Thailand) Sanchai Ratiwatana / (Thailand) Sonchat Ratiwatana (champions)
2. (Argentina) Carlos Berlocq / (Argentina) Leonardo Mayer (withdrew)
3. (Paraguay) Ramón Delgado / (Argentina) Máximo González (quarterfinals)
4. (United States) Alex Kuznetsov / (United States) Todd Widom (withdrew)

== Draw ==
=== Key ===
- Q = Qualifier
- WC = Wild card
- LL = Lucky loser
- Alt = Alternate
- SE = Special exempt
- PR = Protected ranking
- ITF = ITF entry
- JE = Junior exempt
- w/o = Walkover
- r = Retired
- d = Defaulted
- SR = Special ranking

=== Draw ===
First round
1	(Thailand) Sa Ratiwatana (Thailand) So Ratiwatana	6	4	[13]
(Brazil) R Hocevar (Brazil) J Souza	4	6	[11]
WC	(Ecuador) C Avellán (Ecuador) I Endara	4	3
(Brazil) M Torres (South Africa) I van den Merwe	6	6
AL	(Mexico) B Echagaray (Brazil) C Zampieri	3	5
(Colombia) JS Cabal (Colombia) A Falla	6	7
WC	(Ecuador) JS Campozano (United States) E Nunez	6	3	[10]
(Brazil) T Alves (Brazil) A Miele	1	6	[5]
(Israel) H Levy (Israel) N Okun	6	6
(United States) B Battistone (United States) D Battistone	4	4
(Uruguay) P Cuevas (Uruguay) M Felder	5	6	[8]
3	(Paraguay) R Delgado (Argentina) M González	7	3	[10]
(Germany) B Becker (Denmark) K Pless	6
(Colombia) S Giraldo (Spain) F Vicente	6	R
WC	(Argentina) JP Brzezicki (Peru) I Miranda	7	6
ALT	(Colombia) A González (Colombia) C Salamanca	6^{4}	4

Quarterfinals
1	(Thailand) Sa Ratiwatana (Thailand) So Ratiwatana	6	3	[13]
(Brazil) M Torres (South Africa) I van den Merwe	3	6	[11]
(Colombia) JS Cabal (Colombia) A Falla	6	6
WC	(Ecuador) JS Campozano (United States) E Nunez	3	3
(Israel) H Levy (Israel) N Okun
3	(Paraguay) R Delgado (Argentina) M González	w/o
(Germany) B Becker (Denmark) K Pless	6^{1}	1
WC	(Argentina) JP Brzezicki (Peru) I Miranda	7	6

Semifinals
1	(Thailand) Sa Ratiwatana (Thailand) So Ratiwatana	6	6
(Colombia) JS Cabal (Colombia) A Falla	4	4
(Israel) H Levy (Israel) N Okun	6^{5}	1
WC	(Argentina) JP Brzezicki (Peru) I Miranda	7	6

Finals
1	(Thailand) Sa Ratiwatana (Thailand) So Ratiwatana	6	7
WC	(Argentina) JP Brzezicki (Peru) I Miranda	3	6^{4}
