= Iván Miranda =

Peruvian tennis player (born 1980)

Iván Chang
- Full name: Iván Miranda Chang
- Country (sports): Peru
- Born: March 8, 1980 (age 45); Lima, Peru
- Height: 5 ft 9 in (175 cm)
- Plays: Right-handed
- Prize money: $355,570

Singles
- Career record: 25–34
- Highest ranking: No. 104 (July 14, 2003)

Grand Slam singles results
- Australian Open: 1R (2004)
- French Open: 1R (2002)
- US Open: 1R (2003)

Doubles
- Career record: 9–15
- Highest ranking: No. 206 (August 9, 2004)

Iván Miranda Chang (born March 8, 1980) is a professional tennis player from Peru. He achieved a career-high singles ranking of World No. 104 in 2003.

Miranda has participated in 26 Davis Cup events for Peru from 1998 to the present day, posting a 15–18 record in singles and an 8–11 record in doubles.

== Singles titles (3) ==
Legend (singles)
Grand Slam (0)
Tennis Masters Cup (0)
ATP Masters Series (0)
ATP Tour (0)
Challengers (3)

No.	Date	Tournament	Surface	Opponent in the final	Score
1.	2002	Salinas	Hard	(Brazil) Ricardo Mello	6–3, 6–4
2.	2008	Salinas	Hard	(Argentina) Diego Junqueira	6–2, 6–2
3.	2008	Tunica Resorts	Clay	(Australia) Carsten Ball	6–4, 6–4

=== Runners-up (3) ===
No.	Date	Tournament	Surface	Opponent in the final	Score
1.	2002	Gramado	Hard	(Brazil) Júlio Silva	4–6, 2–6
2.	2003	Salinas	Hard	(Ecuador) Giovanni Lapentti	3–6, 4–6
3.	2008	Humacao	Hard	(Luxembourg) Gilles Müller	5–7, 6–7
