= 2012 Challenger ATP de Salinas Diario Expreso – Singles =

Singles
- 2012 Challenger ATP de Salinas Diario Expreso

Final
- Champion: (Argentina) Guido Pella
- Runner-up: (Italy) Paolo Lorenzi
- Score: 1–6, 7–5, 6–3

Events
Singles	Doubles
← 2011 ·	Challenger ATP de Salinas Diario Expreso	· 2013 →

Andrés Molteni was the defending champion, but he lost in the first round.
Guido Pella won the title, defeating Paolo Lorenzi 1–6, 7–5, 6–3 in the final.

== Seeds ==
1. (Spain) Daniel Gimeno-Traver (first round)
2. (Italy) Paolo Lorenzi (final)
3. (Argentina) Horacio Zeballos (quarterfinals)
4. (France) Augustin Gensse (quarterfinals)
5. (France) Guillaume Rufin (first round, retired due to a right hand injury)
6. (Spain) Iván Navarro (quarterfinals)
7. (Dominican Republic) Víctor Estrella (semifinals)
8. (Argentina) Martín Alund (semifinals)

== Draw ==
=== Key ===
- Q = Qualifier
- WC = Wild card
- LL = Lucky loser
- Alt = Alternate
- ITF = ITF entry
- PR = Protected ranking
- SR = Special ranking
- SE = Special exempt
- JE = Junior exempt
- JR = Junior Accelerator Programme entrant
- CO = College Accelerator Programme entrant
- NG = Next Gen Accelerator Program entrant
- w/o = Walkover
- r = Retired
- d = Defaulted

=== Finals ===
Semifinals
(Argentina) Guido Pella	6	6
7	(Dominican Republic) Víctor Estrella	2	2
8	(Argentina) Martín Alund	6^{5}	2
2	(Italy) Paolo Lorenzi	7^{7}	6

Final
(Argentina) Guido Pella	1	7	6
2	(Italy) Paolo Lorenzi	6	5	3

=== Top half ===
First round
1	(Spain) D Gimeno-Traver	3	3
(Argentina) Diego Sebastián Schwartzman	6	6
(Argentina) Marco Trungelliti	4	6	7
(Chile) G Rivera-Aránguiz	6	4	5
WC	(Ecuador) JC Campozano	2	3
(Austria) Michael Linzer	6	6
(Argentina) G Pella	4	7^{7}	3
5	(France) G Rufin	6	6^{5}	2^{r}
3	(Argentina) H Zeballos	6	6
WC	(Ecuador) D Hidalgo	2	2
(Colombia) C Salamanca	6	6
Q	(United States) K Kim	3	2
(Colombia) A González	6^{2}	6	6
Q	(Ecuador) I Endara	7^{7}	4	1
(Austria) G Melzer	7^{7}	6^{5}	3
7	(Dominican Republic) V Estrella	6^{4}	7^{7}	6

Second round
(Argentina) DS Schwartzman	6	2	2
(Argentina) M Trungelliti	2	6	6
(Austria) M Linzer	7	3	3
(Argentina) G Pella	5	6	6
3	(Argentina) H Zeballos	7^{7}	2	6
(Colombia) C Salamanca	6^{5}	6	3
(Colombia) A González	0	6	0
7	(Dominican Republic) V Estrella	6	4	6

Quarterfinals
(Argentina) M Trungelliti	5	4
(Argentina) G Pella	7	6
3	(Argentina) H Zeballos	6^{2}	6^{5}
7	(Dominican Republic) V Estrella	7^{7}	7^{7}

Semifinals
(Argentina) G Pella	6	6
7	(Dominican Republic) V Estrella	2	2

=== Bottom half ===
First round
8	(Argentina) M Alund	3	6	6
(Argentina) A Molteni	6	3	4
WC	(Ecuador) Juan Carvajal	2	0
Q	(Argentina) Guillermo Durán	6	6
(Italy) D Giorgini	6	4
(Germany) K Krawietz	2	1^{r}
(Chile) G Hormazábal	3	6^{6}
4	(France) A Gensse	6	7^{8}
6	(Spain) I Navarro	6	7^{7}
(Uruguay) M Felder	3	6^{2}
(Chile) C Saavedra-Corvalán	6	6
(Moldova) R Borvanov	1	3
Q	(Argentina) Maximiliano Estévez	1	1
(France) J Eysseric	6	6
WC	(Ecuador) J-S Vivanco	0	2
2	(Italy) P Lorenzi	6	6

Second round
8	(Argentina) M Alund	6	7^{7}
Q	(Argentina) G Durán	0	6^{0}
(Italy) D Giorgini	5	7^{7}	2
4	(France) A Gensse	7	6^{1}	6
6	(Spain) I Navarro	6	6
(Chile) C Saavedra-Corvalán	2	1
(France) J Eysseric	5	6^{5}
2	(Italy) P Lorenzi	7	7^{7}

Quarterfinals
8	(Argentina) M Alund	6^{4}	6	6
4	(France) A Gensse	7^{7}	3	1
6	(Spain) I Navarro	3	5
2	(Italy) P Lorenzi	6	7

Semifinals
8	(Argentina) M Alund	6^{5}	2
2	(Italy) P Lorenzi	7^{7}	6
