= 2021 Salinas Challenger – Singles =

Singles
- 2021 Salinas Challenger

Final
- Champion: (Chile) Nicolás Jarry
- Runner-up: (Colombia) Nicolás Mejía
- Score: 7–6^{(9–7)}, 6–1

Events
Singles	Doubles
← 2014 ·	Salinas Challenger	· 2021 →

Víctor Estrella Burgos was the defending champion but chose not to defend his title.

Nicolás Jarry won the title after defeating Nicolás Mejía 7–6^{(9–7)}, 6–1 in the final.

== Seeds ==
1. (Japan) Yasutaka Uchiyama (first round, retired)
2. (Chile) Alejandro Tabilo (first round)
3. (Ecuador) Emilio Gómez (first round)
4. (United States) Christopher Eubanks (second round)
5. (Chile) Marcelo Tomás Barrios Vera (quarterfinals)
6. (Turkey) Altuğ Çelikbilek (semifinals)
7. (Japan) Hiroki Moriya (first round)
8. (Ecuador) Roberto Quiroz (first round)

== Draw ==
=== Key ===
- Q = Qualifier
- WC = Wild card
- LL = Lucky loser
- Alt = Alternate
- SE = Special exempt
- PR = Protected ranking
- ITF = ITF entry
- JE = Junior exempt
- w/o = Walkover
- r = Retired
- d = Defaulted
- SR = Special ranking

=== Finals ===
Semifinals
6	(Turkey) Altuğ Çelikbilek	3	5
Q	(Colombia) Nicolás Mejía	6	7
(Argentina) Camilo Ugo Carabelli	5	3
WC	(Chile) Nicolás Jarry	7	6

Final
Q	(Colombia) Nicolás Mejía	6^{7}	1
WC	(Chile) Nicolás Jarry	7^{9}	6

=== Top half ===
First round
1	(Japan) Y Uchiyama	2	0^{r}
(Netherlands) T van Rijthoven	6	4
(Tunisia) S Mansouri	2	2
(Tunisia) A Dougaz	6	6
(United States) N Chappell	3	2
(Spain) R Ortega Olmedo	6	6
(United States) JC Aragone	2	6^{2}
6	(Turkey) A Çelikbilek	6	7^{7}
3	(Ecuador) E Gómez	4	6	2
(Argentina) H Casanova	6	3	6
WC	(Ecuador) D Hidalgo	3	6	5
Q	(Colombia) N Mejía	6	1	7
(Netherlands) J Sels	6	6
WC	(Ecuador) AC March	4	3
Q	(Argentina) F Díaz Acosta	2	2
5	(Chile) MT Barrios Vera	6	6

Second round
(Netherlands) T van Rijthoven	6	7
(Tunisia) A Dougaz	2	5
(Spain) R Ortega Olmedo	6	4	4
6	(Turkey) A Çelikbilek	1	6	6
(Argentina) H Casanova	1	2
Q	(Colombia) N Mejía	6	6
(Netherlands) J Sels	2	2
5	(Chile) MT Barrios Vera	6	6

Quarterfinals
(Netherlands) T van Ritjhoven	3	6	6^{6}
6	(Turkey) A Çelikbilek	6	2	7^{8}
Q	(Colombia) N Mejía	2	6	7^{7}
5	(Chile) MT Barrios Vera	6	1	6^{3}

Semifinals
6	(Turkey) A Çelikbilek	3	5
Q	(Colombia) N Mejía	6	7

=== Bottom half ===
First round
8	(Ecuador) R Quiroz	6	1	6^{7}
(Argentina) C Ugo Carabelli	4	6	7^{9}
Q	(Czech Republic) M Gengel	2	3
Q	(France) TK Wang	6	6
(Japan) K Uchida	4	4
(Spain) A Menéndez Maceiras	6	6
(Netherlands) J de Jong	6^{3}	6^{3}
4	(United States) C Eubanks	7^{7}	7^{7}
7	(Japan) H Moriya	1	6^{5}
(Japan) Shuichi Sekiguchi	6	7^{7}
(Peru) N Álvarez	1	1
WC	(Chile) N Jarry	6	6
(Ukraine) V Orlov	2	7^{7}	3
(Argentina) TA Tirante	6	6^{4}	6
(United States) K King	3	6	6
2	(Chile) A Tabilo	6	4	1

Second round
(Argentina) C Ugo Carabelli	6	6
Q	(France) TK Wang	1	1
(Spain) A Menéndez Maceiras	7^{8}	6
4	(United States) C Eubanks	6^{6}	1
(Japan) S Sekiguchi	1	2
WC	(Chile) N Jarry	6	6
(Argentina) TA Tirante	6	6
(United States) K King	1	2

Quarterfinals
(Argentina) C Ugo Carabelli	6	6
(Spain) A Menéndez Maceiras	4	4
WC	(Chile) N Jarry	7^{7}	6
(Argentina) TA Tirante	6^{3}	4

Semifinals
(Argentina) C Ugo Carabelli	5	3
WC	(Chile) N Jarry	7	6
