= 2022 Salinas Challenger – Singles =

Singles
- 2022 Salinas Challenger

Final
- Champion: (Ecuador) Emilio Gómez
- Runner-up: (United States) Nicolas Moreno de Alboran
- Score: 6–7^{(2–7)}, 7–6^{(7–4)}, 7–5

Events
Singles	Doubles
← 2021 ·	Salinas Challenger	· 2023 →

Emilio Gómez was the defending champion and successfully defended his title, defeating Nicolas Moreno de Alboran 6–7^{(2–7)}, 7–6^{(7–4)}, 7–5 in the final.

== Seeds ==
1. (Ecuador) Emilio Gómez (champion)
2. (United States) Christopher Eubanks (second round)
3. (Argentina) Camilo Ugo Carabelli (quarterfinals)
4. (India) Ramkumar Ramanathan (first round)
5. (Argentina) Nicolás Kicker (first round)
6. (Switzerland) Alexander Ritschard (semifinals)
7. (Argentina) Andrea Collarini (quarterfinals)
8. (Colombia) Nicolás Mejía (second round)

== Draw ==
=== Key ===
- Q = Qualifier
- WC = Wild card
- LL = Lucky loser
- Alt = Alternate
- SE = Special exempt
- PR = Protected ranking
- ITF = ITF entry
- JE = Junior exempt
- w/o = Walkover
- r = Retired
- d = Defaulted
- SR = Special ranking

=== Finals ===
Semifinals
1	(Ecuador) Emilio Gómez	6	6
6	(Switzerland) Alexander Ritschard	2	2
(Ecuador) Roberto Quiroz	7^{7}	4	2
(United States) Nicolas Moreno de Alboran	6^{3}	6	6

Final
1	(Ecuador) Emilio Gómez	6^{2}	7^{7}	7
(United States) Nicolas Moreno de Alboran	7^{7}	6^{4}	5

=== Top half ===
First round
1	(Ecuador) E Gómez	6	6
WC	(Ecuador) A Guillén Meza	3	3
WC	(Brazil) P Boscardin Dias	3	2
(Brazil) D Dutra da Silva	6	6
Q	(United States) Felix Corwin	7^{8}	6
(Tunisia) A Dougaz	6^{6}	3
(Chinese Taipei) T-l Wu	6	6
5	(Argentina) N Kicker	3	1
3	(Argentina) C Ugo Carabelli	6	5	6
(Argentina) Facundo Juárez	2	7	3
(Tunisia) S Mansouri	6	3	2
(Australia) A Santillan	4	6	6
(Peru) N Álvarez	6^{2}	7^{7}	6
(Dominican Republic) N Hardt	7^{7}	6^{3}	1
Q	(United States) B Holt	2	2
6	(Switzerland) A Ritschard	6	6

Second round
1	(Ecuador) E Gómez	6	6
(Brazil) D Dutra da Silva	3	2
Q	(United States) F Corwin	4	6	6
(Chinese Taipei) T-l Wu	6	4	3
3	(Argentina) C Ugo Carabelli	6	1	6
(Australia) A Santillan	4	6	3
(Peru) N Álvarez	3	6	1
6	(Switzerland) A Ritschard	6	3	6

Quarterfinals
1	(Ecuador) E Gómez	6	7
Q	(United States) F Corwin	1	5
3	(Argentina) C Ugo Carabelli	2	3
6	(Switzerland) A Ritschard	6	6

Semifinals
1	(Ecuador) E Gómez	6	6
6	(Switzerland) A Ritschard	2	2

=== Bottom half ===
First round
8	(Colombia) N Mejía	6	2	6
WC	(Ecuador) C March	1	6	4
(Japan) Yo Watanuki	6^{7}	2
(Ecuador) R Quiroz	7^{9}	6
Q	(United Kingdom) Blu Baker	2	3
(South Korea) Y-s Chung	6	6
(United States) JC Aragone	4	6	7^{7}
4	(India) R Ramanathan	6	1	6^{5}
7	(Argentina) A Collarini	7	6
Q	(Argentina) MF Descotte	5	3
(Australia) R Hijikata	4	6	4
(Greece) M Pervolarakis	6	3	6
(United States) Nicolas Moreno de Alboran	6^{4}	6	6
Q	(Japan) N Nakagawa	7^{7}	4	4
Q	(Japan) S Shimabukuro	7^{7}	2	3
2	(United States) C Eubanks	6^{4}	6	6

Second round
8	(Colombia) N Mejía	4	3
(Ecuador) R Quiroz	6	6
(South Korea) Y-s Chung	5	4
(United States) JC Aragone	7	6
7	(Argentina) A Collarini	7	6
(Greece) M Pervolarakis	5	2
(United States) N Moreno de Alboran	3	6	6
2	(United States) C Eubanks	6	3	4

Quarterfinals
(Ecuador) R Quiroz	2	7^{8}	6
(United States) JC Aragone	6	6^{6}	4
7	(Argentina) A Collarini	3	6^{4}
(United States) N Moreno de Alboran	6	7^{7}

Semifinals
(Ecuador) R Quiroz	7^{7}	4	2
(United States) N Moreno de Alboran	6^{3}	6	6
