= 2013 Challenger ATP de Salinas Diario Expreso – Doubles =

Doubles
- 2013 Challenger ATP de Salinas Diario Expreso

Final
- Champions: (Peru) Sergio Galdós (Argentina) Marco Trungelliti
- Runners-up: (South Africa) Jean Andersen (South Africa) Izak van der Merwe
- Score: 6–4, 6–4

Events
Singles	Doubles
← 2012 ·	Challenger ATP de Salinas Diario Expreso	· 2014 →

Martín Alund and Horacio Zeballos were the defending champions, but did not participate this year.

Sergio Galdós and Marco Trungelliti won the title, defeating Jean Andersen and Izak van der Merwe 6–4, 6–4 in the final.

== Seeds ==
1. (Australia) Jordan Kerr / (Sweden) Andreas Siljeström (quarterfinals)
2. (Argentina) Facundo Bagnis / (Brazil) João Souza (quarterfinals)
3. (Netherlands) Thiemo de Bakker / (United States) Nicholas Monroe (first round)
4. (South Africa) Jean Andersen / (South Africa) Izak van der Merwe (final)

== Draw ==
=== Key ===
- Q = Qualifier
- WC = Wild card
- LL = Lucky loser
- Alt = Alternate
- SE = Special exempt
- PR = Protected ranking
- ITF = ITF entry
- JE = Junior exempt
- w/o = Walkover
- r = Retired
- d = Defaulted
- SR = Special ranking

=== Draw ===
First round
1	(Australia) J Kerr (Sweden) A Siljeström	6	6
WC	(Ecuador) D Hidalgo (Argentina) A Velotti	3	0
(Uruguay) A Behar (Argentina) A Molteni	2	2
(Brazil) G Clezar (Brazil) R Dutra da Silva	6	6
4	(South Africa) J Andersen (South Africa) I van der Merwe	6	6
WC	(United States) Lucas Dages (Chile) N Massú	3	3
(Chile) P Capdeville (Uruguay) M Felder	6	5	[8]
(Peru) D Beretta (Argentina) R Olivo	3	7	[10]
(Peru) S Galdós (Argentina) M Trungelliti	6	7
(Italy) G Naso (Serbia) B Pašanski	4	5
(Brazil) F de Paula (Colombia) A González	4	6	[10]
3	(Netherlands) T de Bakker (United States) N Monroe	6	2	[7]
WC	(United States) Sam Barnett (Romania) C-I Gârd	1	1
(Chile) J Aguilar (Ecuador) JC Campozano	6	6
(Brazil) A Ghem (Brazil) R Hocevar	1	2
2	(Argentina) F Bagnis (Brazil) J Souza	6	6

Quarterfinals
1	(Australia) J Kerr (Sweden) A Siljeström	4	4
(Brazil) G Clezar (Brazil) R Dutra da Silva	6	6
4	(South Africa) J Andersen (South Africa) I van der Merwe	6	6
(Peru) D Beretta (Argentina) R Olivo	1	3
(Peru) S Galdós (Argentina) M Trungelliti	6	6
(Brazil) F de Paula (Colombia) A González	1	2
(Chile) J Aguilar (Ecuador) JC Campozano	6	5	[10]
2	(Argentina) F Bagnis (Brazil) J Souza	1	7	[7]

Semifinals
(Brazil) G Clezar (Brazil) R Dutra da Silva	1	0
4	(South Africa) J Andersen (South Africa) I van der Merwe	6	6
(Peru) S Galdós (Argentina) M Trungelliti	4	7	[10]
(Chile) J Aguilar (Ecuador) JC Campozano	6	5	[3]

Final
4	(South Africa) J Andersen (South Africa) I van der Merwe	4	4
(Peru) S Galdós (Argentina) M Trungelliti	6	6
