= 2021 Salinas Challenger II – Singles =

Singles
- 2021 Salinas Challenger II

Final
- Champion: (Ecuador) Emilio Gómez
- Runner-up: (Chile) Nicolás Jarry
- Score: 4–6, 7–6^{(8–6)}, 6–4

Events
Singles	Doubles
← 2021 ·	Salinas Challenger	· 2022 →

Nicolás Jarry was the defending champion but lost in the final to Emilio Gómez.

Gómez won the title after defeating Jarry 4–6, 7–6^{(8–6)}, 6–4 in the final.

== Seeds ==
1. (Ecuador) Emilio Gómez (champion)
2. (Brazil) João Menezes (first round)
3. (Dominican Republic) Roberto Cid Subervi (first round)
4. (Turkey) Altuğ Çelikbilek (first round)
5. (Japan) Hiroki Moriya (quarterfinals)
6. (Ecuador) Roberto Quiroz (first round)
7. (Spain) Adrián Menéndez Maceiras (second round)
8. (Spain) Roberto Ortega Olmedo (first round)

== Draw ==
=== Key ===
- Q = Qualifier
- WC = Wild card
- LL = Lucky loser
- Alt = Alternate
- SE = Special exempt
- PR = Protected ranking
- ITF = ITF entry
- JE = Junior exempt
- w/o = Walkover
- r = Retired
- d = Defaulted
- SR = Special ranking

=== Finals ===
Semifinals
1	(Ecuador) Emilio Gómez	1	7	4
(Argentina) Thiago Agustín Tirante	6	5	3^{r}
(Argentina) Agustín Velotti	1	2
SE	(Chile) Nicolás Jarry	6	6

Final
1	(Ecuador) Emilio Gómez	4	7^{8}	6
SE	(Chile) Nicolás Jarry	6	6^{6}	4

=== Top half ===
First round
1	(Ecuador) E Gómez	6	6
(Ukraine) V Orlov	1	1
(Japan) K Uchida	5	4
(Argentina) C Ugo Carabelli	7	6
(United States) N Chappell	6	1	5
Q	(France) TK Wang	3	6	7
(Kazakhstan) D Yevseyev	6^{1}	2
5	(Japan) H Moriya	7^{7}	6
4	(Turkey) A Çelikbilek	2	4
(Argentina) TA Tirante	6	6
(Japan) Shuichi Sekiguchi	2	4
(Brazil) P Sakamoto	6	6
Q	(Argentina) G Villanueva	7	6
Q	(Argentina) H Casanova	5	0
(United States) JC Aragone	6	6^{4}	6
6/WC	(Ecuador) R Quiroz	2	7^{7}	2

Second round
1	(Ecuador) E Gómez	7^{7}	7^{7}
(Argentina) C Ugo Carabelli	6^{2}	6^{1}
Q	(France) TK Wang	0	6^{3}
5	(Japan) H Moriya	6	7^{7}
(Argentina) TA Tirante	6	0
(Brazil) P Sakamoto	3	0^{r}
Q	(Argentina) G Villanueva	2	2
(United States) JC Aragone	6	6

Quarterfinals
1	(Ecuador) E Gómez	6	6
5	(Japan) H Moriya	1	4
(Argentina) TA Tirante	6	4	6
(United States) JC Aragone	4	6	1

Semifinals
1	(Ecuador) E Gómez	1	7	4
(Argentina) TA Tirante	6	5	3^{r}

=== Bottom half ===
First round
7	(Spain) A Menéndez Maceiras	7	6
WC	(Ecuador) D Hidalgo	5	0
Q	(Argentina) F Díaz Acosta	4	3
(United States) K King	6	6
(Tunisia) A Dougaz	7^{7}	7
(Netherlands) J Sels	6^{5}	5
(Argentina) A Velotti	5	6	7^{7}
3	(Dominican Republic) R Cid Subervi	7	4	6^{5}
8	(Spain) R Ortega Olmedo	6^{2}	7^{8}	6^{6}
(Netherlands) T van Rijthoven	7^{7}	6^{6}	7^{8}
(Brazil) O Luz	2	4
SE	(Chile) N Jarry	6	6
SE	(Colombia) N Mejía	6	6
WC	(Ecuador) AC March	1	2
(Tunisia) S Mansouri	6^{7}	6	7^{7}
2	(Brazil) J Menezes	7^{9}	4	6^{4}

Second round
7	(Spain) A Menéndez Maceiras	1	6	5
(United States) K King	6	2	7
(Tunisia) A Dougaz	4	6	5
(Argentina) A Velotti	6	4	7
(Netherlands) T van Rijthoven	3	5
SE	(Chile) N Jarry	6	7
SE	(Colombia) N Mejía	3	6	6
(Tunisia) S Mansouri	6	3	2

Quarterfinals
(United States) K King	3	3
(Argentina) A Velotti	6	6
SE	(Chile) N Jarry	6	6
SE	(Colombia) N Mejía	1	2

Semifinals
(Argentina) A Velotti	1	2
SE	(Chile) N Jarry	6	6
