= 2021 Salinas Challenger =

- Date: 19–25 April
- Edition: 20th
- Surface: Hard
- Location: Salinas, Ecuador

Champions

Singles
- (Chile) Nicolás Jarry

Doubles
- (Mexico) Miguel Ángel Reyes-Varela / (Brazil) Fernando Romboli
← 2014 ·	Salinas Challenger	· 2021 →

The 2021 Salinas Challenger was a professional tennis tournament played on hard courts. It was the 20th edition of the tournament which was part of the 2021 ATP Challenger Tour. It took place in Salinas, Ecuador between 19 and 25 April 2021.

== Singles main-draw entrants ==
=== Seeds ===
Country	Player	Rank^{1}	Seed
JPN	Yasutaka Uchiyama	108	1
CHI	Alejandro Tabilo	163	2
ECU	Emilio Gómez	183	3
USA	Christopher Eubanks	233	4
CHI	Marcelo Tomás Barrios Vera	239	5
TUR	Altuğ Çelikbilek	251	6
JPN	Hiroki Moriya	266	7
ECU	Roberto Quiroz	273	8

- ^{1} Rankings as of 12 April 2021.

=== Other entrants ===
The following players received wildcards into the singles main draw:

- (Ecuador) Diego Hidalgo
- (Chile) Nicolás Jarry
- (Ecuador) Antonio Cayetano March

The following players received entry from the qualifying draw:

- (Argentina) Facundo Díaz Acosta
- (Czech Republic) Marek Gengel
- (Colombia) Nicolás Mejía
- (France) Tak Khunn Wang

== Champions ==
=== Singles ===
- (Chile) Nicolás Jarry def. (Colombia) Nicolás Mejía 7–6^{(9–7)}, 6–1.

=== Doubles ===
- (Mexico) Miguel Ángel Reyes-Varela / (Brazil) Fernando Romboli def. (Ecuador) Diego Hidalgo / (Tunisia) Skander Mansouri 7–5, 4–6, [10–2].
