= 2013 Challenger ATP de Salinas Diario Expreso =

- Date: February 25 – March 3
- Edition: 18th
- Prize money: $35,000+H
- Surface: Clay
- Location: Salinas, Ecuador

Champions

Singles
- (Colombia) Alejandro González

Doubles
- (Peru) Sergio Galdós / (Argentina) Marco Trungelliti
← 2012 ·	Challenger ATP de Salinas Diario Expreso	· 2014 →

The 2013 Challenger ATP de Salinas Diario Expreso was a professional tennis tournament played on clay courts. It was the 18th edition of the tournament which was part of the 2013 ATP Challenger Tour. It took place in Salinas, Ecuador between February 25 and March 3, 2013.

== ATP entrants ==
=== Seeds ===
Country	Player	Rank^{1}	Seed
NED	Thiemo de Bakker	111	1
BRA	Rogério Dutra da Silva	117	2
BRA	João Souza	133	3
CHI	Paul Capdeville	144	4
SRB	Boris Pašanski	174	5
ARG	Agustín Velotti	186	6
CHI	Jorge Aguilar	188	7
ITA	Gianluca Naso	196	8

- Rankings are as of February 18, 2013.

=== Other entrants ===
The following players received wildcards into the singles main draw:

- (United States) Lucas Dages
- (Ecuador) Diego Hidalgo
- (Chile) Nicolás Massú
- (Spain) Pere Riba

The following players received entry from the qualifying draw:

- (South Africa) Jean Andersen
- (Slovakia) Jozef Kovalík
- (Chile) Gonzalo Lama
- (Italy) Stefano Travaglia

== Doubles main draw entrants ==
=== Seeds ===
Country	Player	Country	Player	Rank^{1}	Seed
AUS	Jordan Kerr	SWE	Andreas Siljeström	217	1
ARG	Facundo Bagnis	BRA	João Souza	255	2
NED	Thiemo de Bakker	USA	Nicholas Monroe	280	3
RSA	Jean Andersen	RSA	Izak van der Merwe	336	4

- ^{1} Rankings as of February 18, 2013.

=== Other entrants ===
The following pairs received wildcards into the doubles main draw:

- (United States) Sam Barnett / (Romania) Cătălin-Ionuț Gârd
- (United States) Lucas Dages / (Chile) Nicolás Massú
- (Ecuador) Diego Hidalgo / (Argentina) Agustín Velotti

== Champions ==
=== Singles ===
- (Colombia) Alejandro González def. (Argentina) Renzo Olivo, 4–6, 6–3, 7–6^{(9–7)}

=== Doubles ===
- (Peru) Sergio Galdós / (Argentina) Marco Trungelliti def. (South Africa) Jean Andersen / (South Africa) Izak van der Merwe, 6–4, 6–4
