= 2012 Challenger ATP de Salinas Diario Expreso – Doubles =

Doubles
- 2012 Challenger ATP de Salinas Diario Expreso

Final
- Champions: (Argentina) Martín Alund (Argentina) Horacio Zeballos
- Runners-up: (Uruguay) Ariel Behar (Colombia) Carlos Salamanca
- Score: 6–3, 6–3

Events
Singles	Doubles
← 2011 ·	Challenger ATP de Salinas Diario Expreso	· 2013 →

Facundo Bagnis and Federico del Bonis were the defending champions, but did not participate this year.
Martín Alund and Horacio Zeballos won the final 6–3, 6–3 against Ariel Behar and Carlos Salamanca.

== Seeds ==
1. (Uruguay) Marcel Felder / (Argentina) Andrés Molteni (first round)
2. (Argentina) Martín Alund / (Argentina) Horacio Zeballos (champions)
3. (Spain) Daniel Gimeno-Traver / (Spain) Iván Navarro (quarterfinals)
4. (Ecuador) Júlio César Campozano / (Dominican Republic) Víctor Estrella (semifinals)

== Draw ==
=== Key ===
- Q = Qualifier
- WC = Wild card
- LL = Lucky loser
- Alt = Alternate
- SE = Special exempt
- PR = Protected ranking
- ITF = ITF entry
- JE = Junior exempt
- w/o = Walkover
- r = Retired
- d = Defaulted
- SR = Special ranking

=== Draw ===
First round
1	(Uruguay) M Felder (Argentina) A Molteni	3	4
(Uruguay) A Behar (Colombia) C Salamanca	6	6
(Argentina) Guillermo Durán (Argentina) Marco Trungelliti	4	6^{6}
(Chile) G Rivera-Aránguiz (Chile) C Saavedra-Corvalán	6	7^{8}
4	(Ecuador) JC Campozano (Dominican Republic) V Estrella	6	6
(Argentina) Guido Pella (Argentina) Diego Sebastián Schwartzman	1	4
(France) J Eysseric (France) A Gensse	6	6
WC	(United States) Mark Ein (United States) K Kim	1	2
WC	(Ecuador) D Hidalgo (Colombia) M Quintero	2	6	[2]
(Austria) Michael Linzer (Austria) G Melzer	6	2	[10]
(Colombia) A González (Chile) G Hormazábal	6^{2}	6^{5}
3	(Spain) D Gimeno-Traver (Spain) I Navarro	7^{7}	7^{7}
(Italy) D Giorgini (Italy) P Lorenzi	2	3
(Peru) S Galdós (France) G Rufin	6	6
WC	(Ecuador) I Endara (Ecuador) J-S Vivanco	4	6^{6}
2	(Argentina) M Alund (Argentina) H Zeballos	6	7^{8}

Quarterfinals
(Uruguay) A Behar (Colombia) C Salamanca	6	6
(Chile) G Rivera-Aránguiz (Chile) C Saavedra-Corvalán	3	3
4	(Ecuador) JC Campozano (Dominican Republic) V Estrella	6	6
(France) J Eysseric (France) A Gensse	3	2
(Austria) M Linzer (Austria) G Melzer	6	6
3	(Spain) D Gimeno-Traver (Spain) I Navarro	3	2
(Peru) S Galdós (France) G Rufin	1	5
2	(Argentina) M Alund (Argentina) H Zeballos	6	7

Semifinals
(Uruguay) A Behar (Colombia) C Salamanca	7^{7}	3	[10]
4	(Ecuador) JC Campozano (Dominican Republic) V Estrella	6^{5}	6	[7]
(Austria) M Linzer (Austria) G Melzer
2	(Argentina) M Alund (Argentina) H Zeballos	w/o

Final
(Uruguay) A Behar (Colombia) C Salamanca	3	3
2	(Argentina) M Alund (Argentina) H Zeballos	6	6
