= 2022 Salinas Challenger =

- Date: 4 – 10 April
- Edition: 22nd
- Surface: Hard
- Location: Salinas, Ecuador

Champions

Singles
- (Ecuador) Emilio Gómez

Doubles
- (India) Yuki Bhambri / (India) Saketh Myneni
← 2021 ·	Salinas Challenger	· 2023 →

The 2022 Salinas Challenger, also known as Challenger de Salinas Copa Banco Guayaquil presentado por CNT for sponsorship reasons, was a professional tennis tournament played on hard courts. It was the 22nd edition of the tournament which was part of the 2022 ATP Challenger Tour. It took place in Salinas, Ecuador between 4 and 10 April 2022.

== Singles main-draw entrants ==
=== Seeds ===
Country	Player	Rank^{1}	Seed
ECU	Emilio Gómez	145	1
USA	Christopher Eubanks	155	2
ARG	Camilo Ugo Carabelli	170	3
IND	Ramkumar Ramanathan	171	4
ARG	Nicolás Kicker	203	5
SUI	Alexander Ritschard	231	6
ARG	Andrea Collarini	241	7
COL	Nicolás Mejía	264	8

- ^{1} Rankings as of 21 April 2022.

=== Other entrants ===
The following players received wildcards into the singles main draw:

- (Brazil) Pedro Boscardin Dias
- (Ecuador) Álvaro Guillén Meza
- (Ecuador) Cayetano March

The following players received entry from the qualifying draw:

- (United Kingdom) Blu Baker
- (United States) Felix Corwin
- (Argentina) Matías Franco Descotte
- (United States) Brandon Holt
- (Japan) Naoki Nakagawa
- (Japan) Sho Shimabukuro

== Champions ==
=== Singles ===
- (Ecuador) Emilio Gómez def. (United States) Nicolas Moreno de Alboran 6–7^{(2–7)}, 7–6^{(7–4)}, 7–5.

=== Doubles ===
- (India) Yuki Bhambri / (India) Saketh Myneni def. (United States) JC Aragone / (Ecuador) Roberto Quiroz 4–6, 6–3, [10–7].
