= 2022 Salinas Challenger – Doubles =

Doubles
- 2022 Salinas Challenger

Final
- Champions: (India) Yuki Bhambri (India) Saketh Myneni
- Runners-up: (United States) JC Aragone (Ecuador) Roberto Quiroz
- Score: 4–6, 6–3, [10–7]

Events
Singles	Doubles
← 2021 ·	Salinas Challenger	· 2023 →

Nicolás Barrientos and Sergio Galdós were the defending champions but chose not to defend their title.

Yuki Bhambri and Saketh Myneni won the title after defeating JC Aragone and Roberto Quiroz 4–6, 6–3, [10–7] in the final.

== Seeds ==
1. (India) Jeevan Nedunchezhiyan / (India) Ramkumar Ramanathan (first round)
2. (United States) JC Aragone / (Ecuador) Roberto Quiroz (final)
3. (Argentina) Matías Franco Descotte / (Greece) Michail Pervolarakis (first round)
4. (Peru) Conner Huertas del Pino / (Peru) Alexander Merino (quarterfinals)

== Draw ==
=== Key ===
- Q = Qualifier
- WC = Wild card
- LL = Lucky loser
- Alt = Alternate
- SE = Special exempt
- PR = Protected ranking
- ITF = ITF entry
- JE = Junior exempt
- w/o = Walkover
- r = Retired
- d = Defaulted
- SR = Special ranking

First round
1	(India) J Nedunchezhiyan (India) R Ramanathan	3	6^{6}
(India) Y Bhambri (India) S Myneni	6	7^{8}
(Zimbabwe) B Lock (Zimbabwe) CJ Lock	w/o
(Dominican Republic) N Hardt (United States) N Moreno de Alboran
4	(Peru) C Huertas del Pino (Peru) A Merino	6	6
(Moldova) A Cozbinov (United States) B Holt	3	4
(Australia) A Santillan (New Zealand) R Statham	6	7
WC	(Brazil) P Boscardin Dias (Ecuador) Á Guillén Meza	4	5
(Brazil) D Dutra da Silva (Argentina) Facundo Juárez	6	2	[10]
WC	(Ecuador) C March (Japan) S Shimabukuro	4	6	[12]
(South Korea) Y-s Chung (Chinese Taipei) T-l Wu	7^{7}	6
3	(Argentina) MF Descotte (Greece) M Pervolarakis	6^{5}	3
(Australia) R Hijikata (Colombia) N Mejía	w/o
(Argentina) A Collarini (Argentina) N Kicker
(Tunisia) A Dougaz (Tunisia) S Mansouri	6^{7}	2
2	(United States) JC Aragone (Ecuador) R Quiroz	7^{9}	6

Quarterfinals
(India) Y Bhambri (India) S Myneni	6	6
(Zimbabwe) B Lock (Zimbabwe) CJ Lock	3	4
4	(Peru) C Huertas del Pino (Peru) A Merino	5	2
(Australia) A Santillan (New Zealand) R Statham	7	6
WC	(Ecuador) C March (Japan) S Shimabukuro	7	4	[10]
(South Korea) Y-s Chung (Chinese Taipei) T-l Wu	5	6	[7]
(Australia) R Hijikata (Colombia) N Mejía
2	(United States) JC Aragone (Ecuador) R Quiroz	w/o

Semifinals
(India) Y Bhambri (India) S Myneni	6	6
(Australia) A Santillan (New Zealand) R Statham	4	4
WC	(Ecuador) C March (Japan) S Shimabukuro	5	5
2	(United States) JC Aragone (Ecuador) R Quiroz	7	7

Final
(India) Y Bhambri (India) S Myneni	4	6	[10]
2	(United States) JC Aragone (Ecuador) R Quiroz	6	3	[7]
