= 2011 Challenger ATP de Salinas Diario Expreso =

- Date: February 28 – March 6
- Edition: 16th
- Location: Salinas, Ecuador

Champions

Singles
- (Argentina) Andrés Molteni

Doubles
- (Argentina) Facundo Bagnis / (Argentina) Federico Delbonis
← 2010 ·	Challenger ATP de Salinas Diario Expreso	· 2012 →

The 2011 Challenger ATP de Salinas Diario Expreso was a professional tennis tournament played on hard courts. It was the 16th edition of the tournament which was part of the 2011 ATP Challenger Tour. It took place in Salinas, Ecuador between February 28 and March 6, 2011.

== Singles main-draw entrants ==
=== Seeds ===
Country	Player	Rank^{1}	Seed
ARG	Brian Dabul	89	1
ARG	Horacio Zeballos	101	2
BRA	João Souza	125	3
FRA	Éric Prodon	133	4
ARG	Federico Delbonis	143	5
ARG	Diego Junqueira	156	5
BRA	Rogério Dutra da Silva	165	7
CRO	Franko Škugor	182	8

- Rankings are as of February 21, 2011.

=== Other entrants ===
The following players received wildcards into the singles main draw:

- (Ecuador) Arturo Altamirano
- (Brazil) Marcelo Demoliner
- (United States) Eric Nunez
- (Chile) Matías Sborowitz

The following players received entry from the qualifying draw:

- (Ecuador) Júlio César Campozano
- (Argentina) Diego Sebastián Schwartzman
- (Republic of Ireland) Louk Sorensen
- (Italy) Stefano Travaglia

== Champions ==
=== Singles ===
(Argentina) Andrés Molteni def. (Argentina) Horacio Zeballos, 7–5, 7–6(4)

=== Doubles ===
(Argentina) Facundo Bagnis / (Argentina) Federico Delbonis def. (Brazil) Rogério Dutra da Silva / (Brazil) João Souza, 6–2, 6–1
