= 2021 Salinas Challenger II – Doubles =

Doubles
- 2021 Salinas Challenger II

Final
- Champions: (Colombia) Nicolás Barrientos (Peru) Sergio Galdós
- Runners-up: (Ecuador) Antonio Cayetano March (Argentina) Thiago Agustín Tirante
- Score: Walkover

Events
Singles	Doubles
← 2021 ·	Salinas Challenger	· 2022 →

Miguel Ángel Reyes-Varela and Fernando Romboli were the defending champions but chose not to defend their title.

Nicolás Barrientos and Sergio Galdós won the title by walkover after Antonio Cayetano March and Thiago Agustín Tirante withdrew before the final.

== Seeds ==
1. (Brazil) Orlando Luz / (Brazil) João Menezes (first round)
2. (Colombia) Nicolás Barrientos / (Peru) Sergio Galdós (champions)
3. (United States) JC Aragone / (Ecuador) Roberto Quiroz (quarterfinals)
4. (Ecuador) Diego Hidalgo / (Tunisia) Skander Mansouri (semifinals)

== Draw ==
=== Key ===
- Q = Qualifier
- WC = Wild card
- LL = Lucky loser
- Alt = Alternate
- SE = Special exempt
- PR = Protected ranking
- ITF = ITF entry
- JE = Junior exempt
- w/o = Walkover
- r = Retired
- d = Defaulted
- SR = Special ranking

First round
1	(Brazil) O Luz (Brazil) J Menezes	4	4
(Japan) Shuichi Sekiguchi (Japan) K Uchida	6	6
WC	(Ecuador) AC March (Argentina) TA Tirante	6	6^{3}	[10]
(Czech Republic) M Gengel (Ukraine) V Orlov	3	7^{7}	[8]
3	(United States) JC Aragone (Ecuador) R Quiroz	6	6
WC	(Ecuador) Miguel Mateo Larrea (Ecuador) Omar Suárez	1	1
PR	(France) TK Wang (Kazakhstan) D Yevseyev	1	2
(Colombia) A Gómez (United States) JA Ore	6	6
(United States) H Johnson (United States) Y Johnson	4	3
(Peru) N Álvarez (Peru) A Merino	6	6
WC	(Argentina) C Ugo Carabelli (Argentina) A Velotti	1	4
4	(Ecuador) D Hidalgo (Tunisia) S Mansouri	6	6
(Tunisia) A Dougaz (Zimbabwe) B Lock	4	3
Alt	(Argentina) H Casanova (Argentina) F Díaz Acosta	6	6
(Bolivia) B Arias (Bolivia) F Zeballos	3	1
2	(Colombia) N Barrientos (Peru) S Galdós	6	6

Quarterfinals
(Japan) S Sekiguchi (Japan) K Uchida	3	7^{7}	[7]
WC	(Ecuador) AC March (Argentina) TA Tirante	6	6^{2}	[10]
3	(United States) JC Aragone (Ecuador) R Quiroz	6	2	[3]
(Colombia) A Gómez (United States) JA Ore	4	6	[10]
(Peru) N Álvarez (Peru) A Merino	0	1
4	(Ecuador) D Hidalgo (Tunisia) S Mansouri	6	6
Alt	(Argentina) H Casanova (Argentina) F Díaz Acosta	3	6^{5}
2	(Colombia) N Barrientos (Peru) S Galdós	6	7^{7}

Semifinals
WC	(Ecuador) AC March (Argentina) TA Tirante	4	6	[10]
(Colombia) A Gómez (United States) JA Ore	6	3	[5]
4	(Ecuador) D Hidalgo (Tunisia) S Mansouri	3	2
2	(Colombia) N Barrientos (Peru) S Galdós	6	6

Final
WC	(Ecuador) AC March (Argentina) TA Tirante
2	(Colombia) N Barrientos (Peru) S Galdós	w/o
