= 2010 Challenger Salinas Diario Expreso – Doubles =

Doubles
- 2010 Challenger Salinas Diario Expreso

Final
- Champions: (United Kingdom) Jonathan Marray (United Kingdom) Jamie Murray
- Runners-up: (Thailand) Sanchai Ratiwatana (Thailand) Sonchat Ratiwatana
- Score: 6-3, 6-4

Events
Singles	Doubles
← 2009 ·	Challenger Salinas Diario Expreso	· 2011 →

Sanchai Ratiwatana and Sonchat Ratiwatana were the defending champions, but they lost in the final 3-6, 4-6 against Jonathan Marray and Jamie Murray.

== Seeds ==
1. (Thailand) Sanchai Ratiwatana / (Thailand) Sonchat Ratiwatana (final)
2. (United Kingdom) Jonathan Marray / (United Kingdom) Jamie Murray (champions)
3. (United States) David Martin / (Germany) Frank Moser (first round)
4. (Mexico) Santiago González / (Philippines) Treat Conrad Huey (quarterfinals)

== Draw ==
=== Key ===
- Q = Qualifier
- WC = Wild card
- LL = Lucky loser
- Alt = Alternate
- SE = Special exempt
- PR = Protected ranking
- ITF = ITF entry
- JE = Junior exempt
- w/o = Walkover
- r = Retired
- d = Defaulted
- SR = Special ranking

=== Draw ===
First round
1	(Thailand) Sa Ratiwatana (Thailand) So Ratiwatana	7	4	[10]
(Uruguay) M Felder (Colombia) C Salamanca	5	6	[7]
(Dominican Republic) V Estrella (Brazil) J Souza	6	6
WC	(Ecuador) JC Campozano (Ecuador) E Gómez	4	4
3	(United States) D Martin (Germany) F Moser	4	6	[8]
(Canada) V Pospisil (Brazil) M Torres	6	4	[10]
(Colombia) JS Cabal (Colombia) A González	6	1	[10]
WC	(United States) C Fiorentino (United States) J-M Gambill	2	6	[7]
(Brazil) M Demoliner (Brazil) R Guidolin	6	6
WC	(Venezuela) LD Martínez (Ecuador) W Valarezo	2	3
(Brazil) R Dutra da Silva (Brazil) C Zampieri	0	2
4	(Mexico) S González (Philippines) TC Huey	6	6
(Brazil) T Alves (Serbia) B Pašanski	6^{5}	1
(Poland) T Bednarek (Poland) M Kowalczyk	7	6
(Canada) P-L Duclos (Sweden) A Siljeström	4	4
2	(United Kingdom) J Marray (United Kingdom) J Murray	6	6

Quarterfinals
1	(Thailand) Sa Ratiwatana (Thailand) So Ratiwatana	6	6
(Dominican Republic) V Estrella (Brazil) J Souza	2	4
(Canada) V Pospisil (Brazil) M Torres	6	6
(Colombia) JS Cabal (Colombia) A González	4	2
(Brazil) M Demoliner (Brazil) R Guidolin	6	7
4	(Mexico) S González (Philippines) TC Huey	0	5
(Poland) T Bednarek (Poland) M Kowalczyk	4	4
2	(United Kingdom) J Marray (United Kingdom) J Murray	6	6

Semifinals
1	(Thailand) Sa Ratiwatana (Thailand) So Ratiwatana	6	6
(Canada) V Pospisil (Brazil) M Torres	1	4
(Brazil) M Demoliner (Brazil) R Guidolin	2	1
2	(United Kingdom) J Marray (United Kingdom) J Murray	6	6

Final
1	(Thailand) Sa Ratiwatana (Thailand) So Ratiwatana	3	4
2	(United Kingdom) J Marray (United Kingdom) J Murray	6	6
