= 2011 Challenger ATP de Salinas Diario Expreso – Singles =

Singles
- 2011 Challenger ATP de Salinas Diario Expreso

Final
- Champion: (Argentina) Andrés Molteni
- Runner-up: (Argentina) Horacio Zeballos
- Score: 7–5, 7–6(4)

Events
Singles	Doubles
← 2010 ·	Challenger ATP de Salinas Diario Expreso	· 2012 →

Brian Dabul was the defending champion and 1st seed, however he lost to the eventual champion Andrés Molteni.
Molteni defeated Horacio Zeballos 7–5, 7–6(4) in the final. It was the first challenger title of his career.

== Seeds ==
1. (Argentina) Brian Dabul (second round)
2. (Argentina) Horacio Zeballos (final)
3. (Brazil) João Souza (first round)
4. (France) Éric Prodon (first round)
5. (Argentina) Federico del Bonis (quarterfinals)
6. (Argentina) Diego Junqueira (semifinals)
7. (Brazil) Rogério Dutra da Silva (semifinals)
8. (Croatia) Franko Škugor (quarterfinals)

== Draw ==
=== Key ===
- Q = Qualifier
- WC = Wild card
- LL = Lucky loser
- Alt = Alternate
- SE = Special exempt
- PR = Protected ranking
- ITF = ITF entry
- JE = Junior exempt
- w/o = Walkover
- r = Retired
- d = Defaulted
- SR = Special ranking

=== Finals ===
Semifinals
(Argentina) Andrés Molteni	2	6	6
7	(Brazil) Rogério Dutra da Silva	6	4	4
6	(Argentina) Diego Junqueira	4	7	4
2	(Argentina) Horacio Zeballos	6	6	6

Final
(Argentina) Andrés Molteni	7	7
2	(Argentina) Horacio Zeballos	5	6^{4}

=== Top half ===
First round
1/Alt	(Argentina) B Dabul	4	7	6
(Brazil) Rafael Camilo	6	5	1
(Argentina) A Molteni	6	3	6
(Italy) R Ghedin	3	6	3
Q	(Italy) S Travaglia	6	6
WC	(Ecuador) Arturo Altamirano	0	0
Q	(Argentina) DS Schwartzman	0	2
5	(Argentina) F del Bonis	6	6
4	(France) É Prodon	4	2
(Argentina) JP Brzezicki	6	6
Q	(Ecuador) JC Campozano	6	6
WC	(Brazil) M Demoliner	4	2
(Ecuador) G Lapentti	7	6^{8}	7
(Brazil) J Silva	6^{5}	7	6^{0}
Q	(Republic of Ireland) L Sorensen	6	1	4
7	(Brazil) R Dutra da Silva	3	6	6

Second round
1/Alt	(Argentina) B Dabul	6	4	1^{r}
(Argentina) A Molteni	4	6	4
Q	(Italy) S Travaglia	6^{3}	1
5	(Argentina) F del Bonis	7	6
(Argentina) JP Brzezicki	6	6
Q	(Ecuador) JC Campozano	4	3
(Ecuador) G Lapentti	2	6	3
7	(Brazil) R Dutra da Silva	6	3	6

Quarterfinals
(Argentina) A Molteni	7	2	6
5	(Argentina) F del Bonis	6^{5}	6	4
(Argentina) JP Brzezicki	6	5	4
7	(Brazil) R Dutra da Silva	2	7	6

Semifinals
(Argentina) A Molteni	2	6	6
7	(Brazil) R Dutra da Silva	6	4	4

=== Bottom half ===
First round
6	(Argentina) D Junqueira	6	6
WC	(Chile) M Sborowitz	4	2
(Argentina) J Acasuso	6	6
(Brazil) R Hocevar	4	3
(Argentina) P Galdón	6	2
Alt	(Argentina) F Argüello	4	0	r
(Argentina) F Bagnis	6	6
3	(Brazil) J Souza	3	1
8	(Croatia) F Škugor	6	6
(Argentina) S Decoud	3	4
(Brazil) C Zampieri	6	6
(Argentina) M Vassallo Argüello	3	4
(France) J Dasnières de Veigy	6	7
(United States) K Kim	1	5
WC	(United States) E Nunez	3	6	6^{5}
2	(Argentina) H Zeballos	6	3	7

Second round
6	(Argentina) D Junqueira	6	6
(Argentina) J Acasuso	1	3
(Argentina) P Galdón	4	6^{3}
(Argentina) F Bagnis	6	7
8	(Croatia) F Škugor	6	6
(Brazil) C Zampieri	0	2
(France) J Dasnières de Veigy	3	6^{5}
2	(Argentina) H Zeballos	6	7

Quarterfinals
6	(Argentina) D Junqueira	6	6
(Argentina) F Bagnis	1	4
8	(Croatia) F Škugor	3	4
2	(Argentina) H Zeballos	6	6

Semifinals
6	(Argentina) D Junqueira	4	7	4
2	(Argentina) H Zeballos	6	6^{5}	6
