= 2023 Salinas Challenger – Singles =

Singles
- 2023 Salinas Challenger

Final
- Champion: (Ukraine) Illya Marchenko
- Runner-up: (Croatia) Matija Pecotić
- Score: 6–4, 6–4

Events
Singles	Doubles
← 2022 ·	Salinas Challenger	· 2024 →

Emilio Gómez was the two-time defending champion but lost in the second round to Omar Jasika.

Illya Marchenko won the title after defeating Matija Pecotić 6–4, 6–4 in the final.

== Seeds ==
1. (Ecuador) Emilio Gómez (second round)
2. (Japan) Rio Noguchi (quarterfinals)
3. (France) Giovanni Mpetshi Perricard (semifinals)
4. (Japan) Kaichi Uchida (second round)
5. (Australia) Dane Sweeny (second round)
6. (Jordan) Abdullah Shelbayh (quarterfinals)
7. (Kazakhstan) Beibit Zhukayev (quarterfinals)
8. Evgeny Donskoy (second round)

== Draw ==
=== Key ===
- Q = Qualifier
- WC = Wild card
- LL = Lucky loser
- Alt = Alternate
- SE = Special exempt
- PR = Protected ranking
- ITF = ITF entry
- JE = Junior exempt
- w/o = Walkover
- r = Retired
- d = Defaulted
- SR = Special ranking

=== Finals ===
Semifinals
Q	(Croatia) Matija Pecotić	7	6
(Turkey) Altuğ Çelikbilek	5	1
3	(France) Giovanni Mpetshi Perricard	6^{0}	4
(Ukraine) Illya Marchenko	7^{7}	6

Final
Q	(Croatia) Matija Pecotić	4	4
(Ukraine) Illya Marchenko	6	6

=== Top half ===
First round
1	(Ecuador) E Gómez	7^{7}	6
Alt	(Chile) G Lama	6^{4}	2
(Australia) O Jasika	6	6
(Australia) A Walton	4	2
(Australia) T Schoolkate	5	6^{7}
Q	(Croatia) M Pecotić	7	7^{9}
(Australia) L Tu	4	6	2
5	(Australia) D Sweeny	6	4	6
4	(Japan) K Uchida	7^{8}	0	6
(United States) Christian Langmo	6^{6}	6	0
(Turkey) A Çelikbilek	6	6
Alt	(United States) A Mayo	4	2
Q	(United States) M Damm	6	1	4
(Australia) B Tomic	3	6	6
Q	(United States) T Boyer	6^{3}	7^{7}	4
6	(Jordan) A Shelbayh	7^{7}	6^{5}	6

Second round
1	(Ecuador) E Gómez	5	4
(Australia) O Jasika	7	6
Q	(Croatia) M Pecotić	7^{10}	6
5	(Australia) D Sweeny	6^{8}	1
4	(Japan) K Uchida	1	6	4
(Turkey) A Çelikbilek	6	2	6
(Australia) B Tomic	2	2
6	(Jordan) A Shelbayh	6	6

Quarterfinals
(Australia) O Jasika	3	5
Q	(Croatia) M Pecotić	6	7
(Turkey) A Çelikbilek	7	1	6
6	(Jordan) A Shelbayh	5	6	4

Semifinals
Q	(Croatia) M Pecotić	7	6
(Turkey) A Çelikbilek	5	1

=== Bottom half ===
First round
7	(Kazakhstan) B Zhukayev	6	6
Alt	(Brazil) P Boscardin Dias	3	4
SE	(Australia) P Sekulic	7^{8}	6
Alt	(Moldova) A Cozbinov	6^{6}	4
WC	(Ecuador) Ángel Díaz Jalil	5	6^{2}
(Australia) A Bolt	7	7^{7}
Q	(Brazil) M Alves	3	4
3	(France) G Mpetshi Perricard	6	6
8	E Donskoy	6	2	6
WC	(Ecuador) Á Guillén Meza	4	6	3
(United States) O Kumar	6	3	4
(Ukraine) I Marchenko	3	6	6
Q	(United States) Alexander Bernard	2	2
WC	(Ecuador) A Andrade	6	6
Q	(Paraguay) AD Vallejo	4	5
2	(Japan) R Noguchi	6	7

Second round
7	(Kazakhstan) B Zhukayev	7^{7}	6
SE	(Australia) P Sekulic	6^{3}	3
(Australia) A Bolt	6	4	6^{9}
3	(France) G Mpetshi Perricard	3	6	7^{11}
8	E Donskoy	5	5
(Ukraine) I Marchenko	7	7
WC	(Ecuador) A Andrade	6^{3}	1
2	(Japan) R Noguchi	7^{7}	6

Quarterfinals
7	(Kazakhstan) B Zhukayev	6^{9}	7^{8}	4
3	(France) G Mpetshi Perricard	7^{11}	6^{6}	6
(Ukraine) I Marchenko	6	3	7^{7}
2	(Japan) R Noguchi	3	6	6^{2}

Semifinals
3	(France) G Mpetshi Perricard	6^{0}	4
(Ukraine) I Marchenko	7^{7}	6
