= 2021 Salinas Challenger – Doubles =

Doubles
- 2021 Salinas Challenger

Final
- Champions: (Mexico) Miguel Ángel Reyes-Varela (Brazil) Fernando Romboli
- Runners-up: (Ecuador) Diego Hidalgo (Tunisia) Skander Mansouri
- Score: 7–5, 4–6, [10–2]

Events
Singles	Doubles
- Salinas Challenger

Roberto Maytín and Fernando Romboli were the defending champions but only Romboli chose to defend his title, partnering Miguel Ángel Reyes-Varela.

Romboli successfully defended his title, defeating Diego Hidalgo and Skander Mansouri 7–5, 4–6, [10–2] in the final.

== Seeds ==
1. (Mexico) Miguel Ángel Reyes-Varela / (Brazil) Fernando Romboli (champions)
2. (Venezuela) Luis David Martínez / (Spain) Adrián Menéndez Maceiras (quarterfinals)
3. (United States) JC Aragone / (Ecuador) Roberto Quiroz (semifinals)
4. (Colombia) Nicolás Barrientos / (Peru) Sergio Galdós (semifinals)

== Draw ==
Key

- Q = Qualifier
- WC = Wild card
- LL = Lucky loser
- Alt = Alternate
- ITF = ITF entry
- PR = Protected ranking
- SR = Special ranking
- SE = Special exempt
- JE = Junior exempt
- JR = Junior Accelerator Programme entrant
- CO = College Accelerator Programme entrant
- NG = Next Gen Accelerator Program entrant
- w/o = Walkover
- r = Retired
- d = Defaulted

First round
1	(Mexico) MÁ Reyes-Varela (Brazil) F Romboli	6	6
WC	(Colombia) A González (Ecuador) AC March	3	3
WC	(Ecuador) Juan Diego Rojas (Ecuador) Omar Suárez	1	2
(Bolivia) B Arias (Bolivia) F Zeballos	6	6
4	(Colombia) N Barrientos (Peru) S Galdós	3	7^{7}	[10]
(Netherlands) J Sels (Netherlands) T van Rijthoven	6	6^{5}	[6]
(Colombia) A Gómez (United States) JA Ore	2	6^{7}
WC	(Peru) N Álvarez (Argentina) TA Tirante	6	7^{9}
(Tunisia) A Dougaz (Zimbabwe) B Lock	7^{10}	3	[9]
(Turkey) A Çelikbilek (Ukraine) V Orlov	6^{8}	6	[11]
(United States) H Johnson (United States) Y Johnson	6^{3}	4
3	(United States) JC Aragone (Ecuador) R Quiroz	7^{7}	6
Alt	(Czech Republic) M Gengel (Czech Republic) D Poljak	7^{13}	3	[7]
(Ecuador) D Hidalgo (Tunisia) S Mansouri	6^{11}	6	[10]
(Japan) Shuichi Sekiguchi (Japan) K Uchida	1	4
2	(Venezuela) LD Martínez (Spain) A Menéndez Maceiras	6	6

Quarterfinals
1	(Mexico) MÁ Reyes-Varela (Brazil) F Romboli	6	5	[10]
(Bolivia) B Arias (Bolivia) F Zeballos	4	7	[5]
4	(Colombia) N Barrientos (Peru) S Galdós	6^{6}	7^{7}	[11]
WC	(Peru) N Álvarez (Argentina) TA Tirante	7^{8}	6^{3}	[9]
(Turkey) A Çelikbilek (Ukraine) V Orlov	2	4
3	(United States) JC Aragone (Ecuador) R Quiroz	6	6
(Ecuador) D Hidalgo (Tunisia) S Mansouri	7	4	[10]
2	(Venezuela) LD Martínez (Spain) A Menéndez Maceiras	5	6	[8]

Semifinals
1	(Mexico) MÁ Reyes-Varela (Brazil) F Romboli	6	6
4	(Colombia) N Barrientos (Peru) S Galdós	2	4
3	(United States) JC Aragone (Ecuador) R Quiroz	6^{4}	6^{8}
(Ecuador) D Hidalgo (Tunisia) S Mansouri	7^{7}	7^{10}

Final
1	(Mexico) MÁ Reyes-Varela (Brazil) F Romboli	7	4	[10]
(Ecuador) D Hidalgo (Tunisia) S Mansouri	5	6	[2]
