= 2010 Challenger Salinas Diario Expreso =

- Date: January 11 – January 16
- Edition: 15

Champions

Singles
- (Argentina) Brian Dabul

Doubles
- (United Kingdom) Jonathan Marray / (United Kingdom) Jamie Murray
| ← 2009 · | Challenger Salinas Diario Expreso | · 2011 → |

The 2010 Challenger Salinas Diario Expreso was a professional tennis tournament played on outdoor hard courts. It was part of the 2010 ATP Challenger Tour. It took place in Salinas, Ecuador between 11 and 16 January 2010.

== ATP entrants ==
=== Seeds ===
| Country | Player | Rank^{1} | Seed |
|---|---|---|---|
| CHI | Nicolás Massú | 112 | 1 |
| BRA | Thiago Alves | 149 | 2 |
| ARG | Sebastián Decoud | 150 | 3 |
| COL | Carlos Salamanca | 158 | 4 |
| ARG | Brian Dabul | 168 | 5 |
| MEX | Santiago González | 176 | 6 |
| ARG | Diego Junqueira | 193 | 7 |
| BRA | João Souza | 199 | 8 |

- Rankings are as of December 28, 2009

=== Other entrants ===
The following players received wildcards into the singles main draw:

- (Ecuador) Júlio César Campozano
- (United States) Carlton Fiorentino
- (United States) Jan-Michael Gambill
- (Ecuador) Emilio Gómez

The following players received entry from the qualifying draw:

- (Argentina) Facundo Bagnis
- (Canada) Pierre-Ludovic Duclos
- (Ecuador) Iván Endara
- (Slovenia) Luka Gregorc

The following player received the lucky loser spot:

- (Chile) Cristóbal Saavedra-Corvalán

== Champions ==
=== Singles ===
(Argentina) Brian Dabul def. (Chile) Nicolás Massú, 6–3, 6–2

=== Doubles ===
(United Kingdom) Jonathan Marray / (United Kingdom) Jamie Murray def. (Thailand) Sanchai Ratiwatana / (Thailand) Sonchat Ratiwatana, 6–3, 6–4
