= 2011 Challenger ATP de Salinas Diario Expreso – Doubles =

Doubles
- 2011 Challenger ATP de Salinas Diario Expreso

Final
- Champions: (Argentina) Facundo Bagnis (Argentina) Federico del Bonis
- Runners-up: (Brazil) Rogério Dutra da Silva (Brazil) João Souza
- Score: 6–2, 6–1

Events
Singles	Doubles
← 2010 ·	Challenger ATP de Salinas Diario Expreso	· 2012 →

Jonathan Marray and Jamie Murray were the defending champions, but decided not to participate.
Facundo Bagnis and Federico del Bonis defeated 1st seeds Rogério Dutra da Silva and João Souza 6–2, 6–1 in the final.

== Seeds ==
1. (Brazil) Rogério Dutra da Silva / (Brazil) João Souza (final)
2. (Brazil) Júlio Silva / (Brazil) Caio Zampieri (Quarterfinal)
3. (Argentina) Juan Pablo Brzezicki / (Argentina) Andrés Molteni (semifinals)
4. (Argentina) Diego Junqueira / (Argentina) Martín Vassallo Argüello (semifinals)

== Draw ==
=== Key ===
- Q = Qualifier
- WC = Wild card
- LL = Lucky loser
- Alt = Alternate
- SE = Special exempt
- PR = Protected ranking
- ITF = ITF entry
- JE = Junior exempt
- w/o = Walkover
- r = Retired
- d = Defaulted
- SR = Special ranking

=== Draw ===
First round
1	(Brazil) R Dutra da Silva (Brazil) J Souza	7	6
WC	(Ecuador) JC Campozano (Ecuador) R Quiroz	5	2
(Italy) R Ghedin (United States) K Kim	5	5
(Argentina) J Acasuso (Argentina) S Prieto	7	7
3	(Argentina) JP Brzezicki (Argentina) A Molteni	6	6
(France) J Dasnières de Veigy (France) É Prodon	3	2
Alt	(Brazil) J Pereira (Brazil) Thales Turini	6	4	[17]
(Colombia) A González (Colombia) E Struvay	4	6	[15]
(Argentina) Guillermo Durán (Argentina) P Galdón	7	6
WC	(Brazil) G Clézar (Ecuador) Walter Valarezo	6^{4}	1
WC	(Ecuador) Arturo Altamirano (United States) E Nunez	0	4
4	(Argentina) D Junqueira (Argentina) M Vassallo Argüello	6	6
Alt	(Brazil) A Laranja (Brazil) Bruno Semenzato	3	0
(Argentina) F Bagnis (Argentina) F del Bonis	6	6
(Brazil) R Hocevar (Brazil) Tiago Lopes	2	4
2	(Brazil) J Silva (Brazil) C Zampieri	6	6

Quarterfinals
1	(Brazil) R Dutra da Silva (Brazil) J Souza	6	6
(Argentina) J Acasuso (Argentina) S Prieto	2	4
3	(Argentina) JP Brzezicki (Argentina) A Molteni	6	6
Alt	(Brazil) J Pereira (Brazil) Thales Turini	1	1
(Argentina) Guillermo Durán (Argentina) P Galdón	1	3
4	(Argentina) D Junqueira (Argentina) M Vassallo Argüello	6	6
(Argentina) F Bagnis (Argentina) F del Bonis	6	6
2	(Brazil) J Silva (Brazil) C Zampieri	2	2

Semifinals
1	(Brazil) R Dutra da Silva (Brazil) J Souza	6^{2}	6	[10]
3	(Argentina) JP Brzezicki (Argentina) A Molteni	7	3	7
4	(Argentina) D Junqueira (Argentina) M Vassallo Argüello	3	4
(Argentina) F Bagnis (Argentina) F del Bonis	6	6

Final
1	(Brazil) R Dutra da Silva (Brazil) J Souza	2	1
(Argentina) F Bagnis (Argentina) F del Bonis	6	6
