= 2014 Challenger ATP de Salinas Diario Expreso =

- Date: February 24 – March 2
- Edition: 19th
- Prize money: $40,000
- Surface: Clay
- Location: Salinas, Ecuador

Champions

Singles
- (Dominican Republic) Víctor Estrella

Doubles
- (Venezuela) Roberto Maytín / (Brazil) Fernando Romboli
← 2013 ·	Challenger ATP de Salinas Diario Expreso	· 2021 →

The 2014 Challenger ATP de Salinas Diario Expreso was a professional tennis tournament played on clay courts. It was the 19th edition of the tournament which was part of the 2014 ATP Challenger Tour. It took place in Salinas, Ecuador between February 24 and March 2, 2014.

== Singles main-draw entrants ==
=== Seeds ===
Country	Player	Rank^{1}	Seed
DOM	Víctor Estrella Burgos	133	1
SVK	Andrej Martin	139	2
ARG	Martín Alund	154	3
ARG	Renzo Olivo	189	4
AUT	Gerald Melzer	195	5
VEN	David Souto	225	6
ARG	Andrea Collarini	243	7
COL	Carlos Salamanca	245	8

- Rankings are as of February 17, 2014.

=== Other entrants ===
The following players received wildcards into the singles main draw:

- (Ecuador) Julio César Campozano
- (United States) Joseph Correa
- (Ecuador) Giovanni Lapentti
- (United States) Jesse Witten

The following players gained entry into the singles main draw as an alternate:

- (Argentina) Maximiliano Estévez

The following players received entry from the qualifying draw:

- (Chile) Bastian Malla
- (Chile) Christian Garín
- (Argentina) Guillermo Durán
- (Colombia) Eduardo Struvay

== Champions ==
=== Singles ===
- (Dominican Republic) Víctor Estrella def. (Argentina) Andrea Collarini, 6–3, 6–4

=== Doubles ===
- (Venezuela) Roberto Maytín / (Brazil) Fernando Romboli def. (Bolivia) Hugo Dellien / (Argentina) Eduardo Schwank, 6–3, 6–4
