= 2023 Salinas Challenger – Doubles =

Doubles
- 2023 Salinas Challenger

Final
- Champions: (United States) Vasil Kirkov (United States) Alfredo Perez
- Runners-up: (Ecuador) Ángel Díaz Jalil (Ecuador) Álvaro Guillén Meza
- Score: 7–5, 7–5

Events
Singles	Doubles
← 2022 ·	Salinas Challenger	· 2024 →

Yuki Bhambri and Saketh Myneni were the defending champions but chose not to defend their title.

Vasil Kirkov and Alfredo Perez won the title after defeating Ángel Díaz Jalil and Álvaro Guillén Meza 7–5, 7–5 in the final.

== Seeds ==
1. (Australia) Blake Ellis / (Australia) Tristan Schoolkate (semifinals)
2. (Peru) Arklon Huertas del Pino / (Peru) Conner Huertas del Pino (quarterfinals)
3. (Australia) Calum Puttergill / (Australia) Dane Sweeny (quarterfinals)
4. (United States) Vasil Kirkov / (United States) Alfredo Perez (champions)

== Draw ==
=== Key ===
- Q = Qualifier
- WC = Wild card
- LL = Lucky loser
- Alt = Alternate
- SE = Special exempt
- PR = Protected ranking
- ITF = ITF entry
- JE = Junior exempt
- w/o = Walkover
- r = Retired
- d = Defaulted
- SR = Special ranking

First round
(Ecuador) A Andrade (Jordan) A Shelbayh	6	6
(Colombia) JS Gómez (Colombia) A Urrea	4	3
4	(United States) V Kirkov (United States) A Perez	7^{7}	6
(Brazil) M Alves (United States) T Boyer	6^{4}	0
(Brazil) P Boscardin Dias (Chile) M Soto	6	6
(Peru) J Panta (Canada) K Stevenson	2	3
(Australia) O Jasika (Australia) A Walton	6	6
(Turkey) A Çelikbilek (Colombia) Alejandro Hoyos	4	4
WC	(Ecuador) Marcos Lee Chan Baratau (Ecuador) Miguel Mateo Larrea	3	0
WC	(Ecuador) Ángel Díaz Jalil (Ecuador) A Guillén Meza	6	6

Quarterfinals
1	(Australia) B Ellis (Australia) T Schoolkate	6	6
(Ecuador) A Andrade (Jordan) A Shelbayh	3	4
4	(United States) V Kirkov (United States) A Perez	3	7	[10]
(Brazil) P Boscardin Dias (Chile) M Soto	6	5	[2]
(Australia) O Jasika (Australia) A Walton	7^{7}	6
3	(Australia) C Puttergill (Australia) D Sweeny	6^{5}	3
WC	(Ecuador) Á Díaz Jalil (Ecuador) A Guillén Meza	6	3	[10]
2	(Peru) A Huertas del Pino (Peru) C Huertas del Pino	1	6	[7]

Semifinals
1	(Australia) B Ellis (Australia) T Schoolkate	2	4
4	(United States) V Kirkov (United States) A Perez	6	6
(Australia) O Jasika (Australia) A Walton	6^{5}	6	[12]
WC	(Ecuador) Á Díaz Jalil (Ecuador) A Guillén Meza	7^{7}	2	[14]

Final
4	(United States) V Kirkov (United States) A Perez	7	7
WC	(Ecuador) Á Díaz Jalil (Ecuador) A Guillén Meza	5	5
