= 98th meridian =

98th meridian may refer to:

- 98th meridian east, a line of longitude east of the Greenwich Meridian
- 98th meridian west, a line of longitude west of the Greenwich Meridian

98th meridian west	98th meridian east
