= 2021 Salinas Challenger II =

- Date: 26 April – 2 May
- Edition: 21st
- Surface: Hard
- Location: Salinas, Ecuador

Champions

Singles
- (Ecuador) Emilio Gómez

Doubles
- (Colombia) Nicolás Barrientos / (Peru) Sergio Galdós
← 2021 ·	Salinas Challenger	· 2022 →

The 2021 Salinas Challenger II was a professional tennis tournament played on green hard courts. It was the 21st edition of the tournament which was part of the 2021 ATP Challenger Tour. It took place in Salinas, Ecuador between 26 April and 2 May 2021.

== Singles main-draw entrants ==
=== Seeds ===
Country	Player	Rank^{1}	Seed
ECU	Emilio Gómez	184	1
BRA	João Menezes	201	2
DOM	Roberto Cid Subervi	230	3
TUR	Altuğ Çelikbilek	250	4
JPN	Hiroki Moriya	265	5
ECU	Roberto Quiroz	274	6
ESP	Adrián Menéndez Maceiras	295	7
ESP	Roberto Ortega Olmedo	299	8

- ^{1} Rankings as of 19 April 2021.

=== Other entrants ===
The following players received wildcards into the singles main draw:

- (Ecuador) Diego Hidalgo
- (Ecuador) Antonio Cayetano March
- (Ecuador) Roberto Quiroz

The following players received entry into the singles main draw as special exempts:

- (Chile) Nicolás Jarry
- (Colombia) Nicolás Mejía

The following players received entry from the qualifying draw:

- (Argentina) Hernán Casanova
- (Argentina) Facundo Díaz Acosta
- (Argentina) Gonzalo Villanueva
- (France) Tak Khunn Wang

== Champions ==
=== Singles ===
- (Ecuador) Emilio Gómez def. (Chile) Nicolás Jarry 4–6, 7–6^{(8–6)}, 6–4.

=== Doubles ===
- (Colombia) Nicolás Barrientos / (Peru) Sergio Galdós def. (Ecuador) Antonio Cayetano March / (Argentina) Thiago Agustín Tirante Walkover.
