= 81st meridian =

81st meridian may refer to:

- 81st meridian east, a line of longitude east of the Greenwich Meridian
- 81st meridian west, a line of longitude west of the Greenwich Meridian

81st meridian west	81st meridian east
