= 99th meridian =

99th meridian may refer to:

- 99th meridian east, a line of longitude east of the Greenwich Meridian
- 99th meridian west, a line of longitude west of the Greenwich Meridian

99th meridian west	99th meridian east
