= 2010 Challenger Salinas Diario Expreso – Singles =

Singles
- 2010 Challenger Salinas Diario Expreso

Final
- Champion: (Argentina) Brian Dabul
- Runner-up: (Chile) Nicolás Massú
- Score: 6-3, 6-2

Events
Singles	Doubles
← 2009 ·	Challenger Salinas Diario Expreso	· 2011 →

Santiago Giraldo was the defending champion, but chose to not participate this year.

Brian Dabul won in the final 6–3, 6–2 against Nicolás Massú.

== Seeds ==
1. (Chile) Nicolás Massú (final)
2. (Brazil) Thiago Alves (first round)
3. (Argentina) Sebastián Decoud (second round)
4. (Colombia) Carlos Salamanca (second round)
5. (Argentina) Brian Dabul (champion)
6. (Mexico) Santiago González (second round)
7. (Argentina) Diego Junqueira (quarterfinals)
8. (Brazil) João Souza (quarterfinals)

== Draw ==
=== Key ===
- Q = Qualifier
- WC = Wild card
- LL = Lucky loser
- Alt = Alternate
- ITF = ITF entry
- PR = Protected ranking
- SR = Special ranking
- SE = Special exempt
- JE = Junior exempt
- JR = Junior Accelerator Programme entrant
- CO = College Accelerator Programme entrant
- NG = Next Gen Accelerator Program entrant
- w/o = Walkover
- r = Retired
- d = Defaulted

=== Finals ===
Semifinals
1	(Chile) Nicolás Massú	7	6
(Brazil) Caio Zampieri	6^{4}	3
(Lithuania) Ričardas Berankis	2	2
5	(Argentina) Brian Dabul	6	6

Final
1	(Chile) Nicolás Massú	3	2
5	(Argentina) Brian Dabul	6	6

=== Top half ===
First round
1	(Chile) N Massú	6	7
Q	(Argentina) F Bagnis	4	5
WC	(Ecuador) E Gómez	4	4
(Brazil) M Demoliner	6	6
(Spain) G Alcaide	6	6^{2}	1
(Colombia) A González	3	7	6
(Chile) J Aguilar	6^{4}	3
8	(Brazil) J Souza	7	6
4	(Colombia) C Salamanca	6	2	7
(Serbia) B Pašanski	4	6	5
WC	(Ecuador) JC Campozano	4	6^{0}
(Brazil) C Zampieri	6	7
Q	(Slovenia) L Gregorc	6	6
WC	(United States) C Fiorentino	2	1
(Uruguay) M Felder	4	6	4
6	(Mexico) S González	6	3	6

Second round
1	(Chile) N Massú	7	7
(Brazil) M Demoliner	6^{6}	6^{3}
(Colombia) A González	3	2
8	(Brazil) J Souza	6	6
4	(Colombia) C Salamanca	6^{7}	3
(Brazil) C Zampieri	7	6
Q	(Slovenia) L Gregorc	6	5	7
6	(Mexico) S González	4	7	6^{4}

Quarterfinals
1	(Chile) N Massú	1	7	6
8	(Brazil) J Souza	6	6^{7}	4
(Brazil) C Zampieri	6	7
Q	(Slovenia) L Gregorc	1	5

Semifinals
1	(Chile) N Massú	7	6
(Brazil) C Zampieri	6^{4}	3

=== Bottom half ===
First round
7	(Argentina) D Junqueira	3	6	6
(Argentina) M Alund	6	4	2
(Canada) V Pospisil	6^{8}	6^{7}
(United States) M McClune	7	7
(Lithuania) R Berankis	6	4	6
LL	(Chile) C Saavedra-Corvalán	1	6	2
WC	(United States) J-M Gambill	6	3	2
3	(Argentina) S Decoud	3	6	6
5	(Argentina) B Dabul	7	6
(Dominican Republic) V Estrella	6^{4}	1
Q	(Canada) P-L Duclos	6	3	4
Q	(Ecuador) I Endara	2	6	6
(Brazil) R Dutra da Silva	6	6
(Argentina) G Pella	2	3
(Serbia) F Krajinović	1	6	7
2	(Brazil) T Alves	6	1	5

Second round
7	(Argentina) D Junqueira	7	6
(United States) M McClune	5	1
(Lithuania) R Berankis	6	7
3	(Argentina) S Decoud	3	6^{3}
5	(Argentina) B Dabul	6	6
Q	(Ecuador) I Endara	2	1
(Brazil) R Dutra da Silva	7	3	6
(Serbia) F Krajinović	6^{1}	6	2

Quarterfinals
7	(Argentina) D Junqueira	3	3
(Lithuania) R Berankis	6	6
5	(Argentina) B Dabul	7	6^{5}	6
(Brazil) R Dutra da Silva	5	7	1

Semifinals
(Lithuania) R Berankis	2	2
5	(Argentina) B Dabul	6	6
