= 2023 Salinas Challenger =

- Date: 24 – 29 July
- Edition: 23rd
- Surface: Hard
- Location: Salinas, Ecuador

Champions

Singles
- (Ukraine) Illya Marchenko

Doubles
- (United States) Vasil Kirkov / (United States) Alfredo Perez
← 2022 ·	Salinas Challenger	· 2024 →

The 2023 Salinas Challenger was a professional tennis tournament played on hard courts. It was the 23rd edition of the tournament which was part of the 2023 ATP Challenger Tour. It took place in Salinas, Ecuador between 24 and 29 July 2023.

== Singles main-draw entrants ==
=== Seeds ===
Country	Player	Rank^{1}	Seed
ECU	Emilio Gómez	138	1
JPN	Rio Noguchi	204	2
FRA	Giovanni Mpetshi Perricard	208	3
JPN	Kaichi Uchida	217	4
AUS	Dane Sweeny	239	5
JOR	Abdullah Shelbayh	240	6
KAZ	Beibit Zhukayev	242	7
	Evgeny Donskoy	243	8

- ^{1} Rankings as of 17 July 2023.

=== Other entrants ===
The following players received wildcards into the singles main draw:

- (Ecuador) Andrés Andrade
- (Ecuador) Ángel Díaz Jalil
- (Ecuador) Álvaro Guillén Meza

The following player received entry into the singles main draw as a special exempt:

- (Australia) Philip Sekulic

The following players received entry into the singles main draw as alternates:

- (Brazil) Pedro Boscardin Dias
- (Moldova) Alexander Cozbinov
- (Chile) Gonzalo Lama
- (United States) Aidan Mayo

The following players received entry from the qualifying draw:

- (Brazil) Mateus Alves
- (United States) Alexander Bernard
- (United States) Tristan Boyer
- (United States) Martin Damm
- (Croatia) Matija Pecotić
- (Paraguay) Daniel Vallejo

== Champions ==
=== Singles ===
- (Ukraine) Illya Marchenko def. (Croatia) Matija Pecotić 6–4, 6–4.

=== Doubles ===
- (United States) Vasil Kirkov / (United States) Alfredo Perez def. (Ecuador) Ángel Díaz Jalil / (Ecuador) Álvaro Guillén Meza 7–5, 7–5.
