= 2013 Challenger ATP de Salinas Diario Expreso – Singles =

Singles
- 2013 Challenger ATP de Salinas Diario Expreso

Final
- Champion: (Colombia) Alejandro González
- Runner-up: (Argentina) Renzo Olivo
- Score: 4–6, 6–3, 7–6^{(9–7)}

Events
| Singles | Doubles |
- Challenger ATP de Salinas Diario Expreso

Guido Pella was the defending champion, but chose not to compete.
Alejandro González defeated Renzo Olivo 4–6, 6–3, 7–6^{(9–7)} in the final to win the title.

== Seeds ==
1. (Netherlands) Thiemo de Bakker (first round)
2. (Brazil) Rogério Dutra da Silva (second round)
3. (Brazil) João Souza (semifinals)
4. (Chile) Paul Capdeville (first round)
5. (Serbia) Boris Pašanski (first round)
6. (Argentina) Agustín Velotti (first round)
7. (Chile) Jorge Aguilar (second round)
8. (Italy) Gianluca Naso (quarterfinals)

== Draw ==
Key

- Q = Qualifier
- WC = Wild card
- LL = Lucky loser
- Alt = Alternate
- ITF = ITF entry
- PR = Protected ranking
- SR = Special ranking
- SE = Special exempt
- JE = Junior exempt
- JR = Junior Accelerator Programme entrant
- CO = College Accelerator Programme entrant
- NG = Next Gen Accelerator Program entrant
- w/o = Walkover
- r = Retired
- d = Defaulted

=== Finals ===
Semifinals
Q | (Italy) Stefano Travaglia | 4 | 4
(Argentina) Renzo Olivo | 6 | 6
3 | (Brazil) João Souza | 3 | 2
(Colombia) Alejandro González | 6 | 6

Final
(Argentina) Renzo Olivo | 6 | 3 | 6^{7}
(Colombia) Alejandro González | 4 | 6 | 7^{9}

=== Top half ===
First round
1 | (Netherlands) T de Bakker | 2 | 6 | 1
(Argentina) F Bagnis | 6 | 0 | 6
(Czech Republic) I Minář | 3 | 6 | 5
(Chile) H Podlipnik | 6 | 3 | 7
(Brazil) A Ghem | 6 | 1 | 6
(Argentina) M Estévez | 1 | 6 | 3
Q | (Italy) S Travaglia | 4 | 6 | 6
6 | (Argentina) A Velotti | 6 | 2 | 2
4 | (Chile) P Capdeville | 6^{1} | 2
(Italy) T Fabbiano | 7^{7} | 6
(Argentina) R Olivo | 2 | 6 | 6
WC | (Chile) N Massú | 6 | 3 | 4
Q | (South Africa) J Andersen | 2 | 7^{7} | 7
(Brazil) R Hocevar | 6 | 6^{2} | 5
(United Kingdom) J Ward | 4 | 7^{7} | 3
8 | (Italy) G Naso | 6 | 6^{5} | 6

Second round
(Argentina) F Bagnis | 5 | 6 | 4
(Chile) H Podlipnik | 7 | 2 | 6
(Brazil) A Ghem | 0 | 6^{5}
Q | (Italy) S Travaglia | 6 | 7^{7}
(Italy) T Fabbiano | 7^{7} | 3 | 6^{2}
(Argentina) R Olivo | 6^{5} | 6 | 7^{7}
Q | (South Africa) J Andersen | 4 | 4
8 | (Italy) G Naso | 6 | 6

Quarterfinals
(Chile) H Podlipnik | 6^{3} | 6 | 6^{6}
Q | (Italy) S Travaglia | 7^{7} | 0 | 7^{8}
(Argentina) R Olivo | 5 | 6 | 7^{8}
8 | (Italy) G Naso | 7 | 3 | 6^{6}

Semifinals
Q | (Italy) S Travaglia | 4 | 4
(Argentina) R Olivo | 6 | 6

=== Bottom half ===
First round
5 | (Serbia) B Pašanski | 4 | 6 | 2
Q | (Chile) G Lama | 6 | 1 | 6
(Ecuador) JC Campozano | 7^{7} | 3
WC | (Ecuador) D Hidalgo | 6^{3} | 0^{r}
(Austria) G Melzer | 2 | 0^{r}
(Argentina) M Trungelliti | 6 | 0
(Brazil) G Clezar | 1 | 4
3 | (Brazil) J Souza | 6 | 6
7 | (Chile) J Aguilar | 6 | 1 | 6
WC | (Spain) P Riba | 2 | 6 | 2
Q | (Slovakia) J Kovalík | 6 | 1 | 6
(Canada) S Diez | 0 | 6 | 4
(Colombia) A González | 7^{7} | 6
(Brazil) F de Paula | 6^{4} | 2
WC | (United States) Lucas Dages | 0 | 0
2 | (Brazil) R Dutra da Silva | 6 | 6

Second round
Q | (Chile) G Lama | 3 | 3
(Ecuador) JC Campozano | 6 | 6
(Argentina) M Trungelliti | 1 | 4
3 | (Brazil) J Souza | 6 | 6
7 | (Chile) J Aguilar | 7^{7} | 6^{6} | 3
Q | (Slovakia) J Kovalík | 6^{4} | 7^{8} | 6
(Colombia) A González | 2 | 6 | 6
2 | (Brazil) R Dutra da Silva | 6 | 0 | 0

Quarterfinals
(Ecuador) JC Campozano | 5 | 4
3 | (Brazil) J Souza | 7 | 6
Q | (Slovakia) J Kovalík | 6 | 4 | 5
(Colombia) A González | 4 | 6 | 7

Semifinals
3 | (Brazil) J Souza | 3 | 2
(Colombia) A González | 6 | 6
