= 81st meridian west =

Line of longitude

81st meridian west

The meridian 81° west of Greenwich is a line of longitude that extends from the North Pole across the Arctic Ocean, North America, the Atlantic Ocean, the Caribbean Sea, Panama, the Pacific Ocean, South America, the Southern Ocean, and Antarctica to the South Pole.

The 81st meridian west forms a great circle with the 99th meridian east.

== From Pole to Pole ==
Starting at the North Pole and heading south to the South Pole, the 81st meridian west passes through:

Co-ordinates	Country, territory or sea	Notes
90°0′N 81°0′W	Arctic Ocean	
82°49′N 81°0′W	Canada	Nunavut — Ellesmere Island
76°8′N 81°0′W	Jones Sound	
75°37′N 81°0′W	Canada	Nunavut — Devon Island
76°8′N 81°0′W	Lancaster Sound	
73°45′N 81°0′W	Navy Board Inlet	Passing just west of Bylot Island, Nunavut, Canada (at 73°36′N 80°53′W)
73°13′N 81°0′W	Canada	Nunavut — Baffin Island
69°45′N 81°0′W	Foxe Basin	Passing just east of the Melville Peninsula, Nunavut, Canada (at 69°5′N 81°13′W)
65°30′N 81°0′W	Foxe Channel	
63°59′N 81°0′W	Canada	Nunavut — Bell Peninsula, Southampton Island
63°26′N 81°0′W	Hudson Bay	
54°50′N 81°0′W	James Bay	
56°7′N 81°0′W	Canada	Nunavut — Akimiski Island
52°44′N 81°0′W	James Bay	
52°1′N 81°0′W	Canada	Ontario — passing through Georgian Bay, Lake Huron
42°39′N 81°0′W	Lake Erie	
41°51′N 81°0′W	United States	Ohio; West Virginia — from 39°34′N 81°0′W; Virginia — from 37°18′N 81°0′W; North Carolina — from 36°33′N 81°0′W; South Carolina — from 35°4′N 81°0′W, passing through Columbia (at 34°0′N 81°0′W); Georgia — from 32°5′N 81°0′W
31°51′N 81°0′W	Atlantic Ocean	
29°12′N 81°0′W	United States	Florida
25°7′N 81°0′W	Florida Bay	
24°44′N 81°0′W	United States	Florida — Key Vaca
24°43′N 81°0′W	Atlantic Ocean	Straits of Florida
23°6′N 81°0′W	Cuba	
22°3′N 81°0′W	Caribbean Sea	Passing just east of the island of Grand Cayman, Cayman Islands (at 19°20′N 81°5′W)
8°50′N 81°0′W	Panama	Near Santiago in Veraguas.
7°37′N 81°0′W	Pacific Ocean	
2°11′S 81°0′W	Ecuador	For about 1 km near the city of Salinas
2°12′S 81°0′W	Pacific Ocean	Gulf of Guayaquil
4°1′S 81°0′W	Peru	
5°23′S 81°0′W	Pacific Ocean	
5°50′S 81°0′W	Peru	
6°8′S 81°0′W	Pacific Ocean	Passing just west of Alejandro Selkirk Island, Chile (at 33°44′S 80°47′W)
60°0′S 81°0′W	Southern Ocean	
73°16′S 81°0′W	Antarctica	Territory claimed by Chile

== See also ==
- 80th meridian west
- 82nd meridian west
