= 82nd meridian west =

Line of longitude

82nd meridian west

The meridian 82° west of Greenwich is a line of longitude that extends from the North Pole across the Arctic Ocean, North America, the Gulf of Mexico, the Caribbean Sea, Panama, the Pacific Ocean, the Southern Ocean, and Antarctica to the South Pole.

The 82nd meridian west forms a great circle with the 98th meridian east.

== From Pole to Pole ==
Starting at the North Pole and heading south to the South Pole, the 82nd meridian west passes through:

Co-ordinates	Country, territory or sea	Notes
90°0′N 82°0′W	Arctic Ocean	
82°39′N 82°0′W	Canada	Nunavut — Ellesmere Island
76°30′N 82°0′W	Jones Sound	
75°49′N 82°0′W	Canada	Nunavut — Devon Island
74°28′N 82°0′W	Lancaster Sound	
73°44′N 82°0′W	Canada	Nunavut — Baffin Island
69°53′N 82°0′W	Foxe Basin	
69°16′N 82°0′W	Canada	Nunavut — Melville Peninsula (mainland)
66°52′N 82°0′W	Foxe Basin	
64°37′N 82°0′W	Canada	Nunavut — Southampton Island
63°39′N 82°0′W	Evans Strait	
62°57′N 82°0′W	Canada	Nunavut — Coats Island
62°41′N 82°0′W	Hudson Bay	
55°0′N 82°0′W	James Bay	
53°3′N 82°0′W	Canada	Nunavut — Akimiski Island
52°59′N 82°0′W	James Bay	
52°47′N 82°0′W	Canada	Ontario — mainland and Manitoulin Island
45°33′N 82°0′W	Lake Huron	
43°12′N 82°0′W	Canada	Ontario
42°15′N 82°0′W	Lake Erie	
41°31′N 82°0′W	United States	Ohio; West Virginia — from 39°0′N 82°0′W; Kentucky — for about 2 km from 37°32′N 82°0′W; Virginia — from 37°31′N 82°0′W; Tennessee — from 36°35′N 82°0′W; North Carolina — from 36°9′N 82°0′W; South Carolina — from 35°11′N 82°0′W; Georgia — from 33°31′N 82°0′W; Florida — from 30°47′N 82°0′W
26°29′N 82°0′W	Gulf of Mexico	Passing just east of Boca Grande Key, Florida, United States (at 24°32′N 82°0′W)
23°11′N 82°0′W	Cuba	
22°18′N 82°0′W	Caribbean Sea	
21°39′N 82°0′W	Cuba	Canarreos Archipelago
21°36′N 82°0′W	Caribbean Sea	
9°10′N 82°0′W	Gulf of Chiriquí	
8°57′N 82°0′W	Panama	
8°12′N 82°0′W	Pacific Ocean	Passing just west of the island of Coiba, Panama (at 7°31′N 81°53′W)
60°0′S 82°0′W	Southern Ocean	
73°56′S 82°0′W	Antarctica	Territory claimed by Chile

== See also ==
- 81st meridian west
- 83rd meridian west
