= 2014 Challenger ATP de Salinas Diario Expreso – Singles =

Singles
- 2014 Challenger ATP de Salinas Diario Expreso

Final
- Champion: (Dominican Republic) Víctor Estrella Burgos
- Runner-up: (Argentina) Andrea Collarini
- Score: 6–3, 6–4

Events
Singles	Doubles
- Challenger ATP de Salinas Diario Expreso

The 2014 Challenger ATP de Salinas Diario Expreso, a professional tennis tournament in Ecuador, involved both singles and doubles competition.

In singles, Alejandro González was the defending champion, but chose to compete at the 2014 Brasil Open.

Víctor Estrella Burgos won the title, defeating Andrea Collarini in the final, 6–3, 6–4.

== Seeds ==
1. (Dominican Republic) Víctor Estrella Burgos (champion)
2. (Slovakia) Andrej Martin (second round)
3. (Argentina) Martín Alund (first round)
4. (Argentina) Renzo Olivo (semifinals)
5. (Austria) Gerald Melzer (second round)
6. (Venezuela) David Souto (second round)
7. (Argentina) Andrea Collarini (final)
8. (Colombia) Carlos Salamanca (quarterfinals, retired)

== Draw ==
Key

- Q = Qualifier
- WC = Wild card
- LL = Lucky loser
- Alt = Alternate
- ITF = ITF entry
- PR = Protected ranking
- SR = Special ranking
- SE = Special exempt
- JE = Junior exempt
- JR = Junior Accelerator Programme entrant
- CO = College Accelerator Programme entrant
- NG = Next Gen Accelerator Program entrant
- w/o = Walkover
- r = Retired
- d = Defaulted

=== Finals ===
Semifinals
1	(Dominican Republic) Víctor Estrella Burgos	7^{7}	4	6
4	(Argentina) Renzo Olivo	6^{3}	6	3
7	(Argentina) Andrea Collarini	6^{3}	7^{7}	6
(Ecuador) Emilio Gómez	7^{7}	6^{2}	4

Final
1	(Dominican Republic) Víctor Estrella Burgos	6	6
7	(Argentina) Andrea Collarini	3	4

=== Top half ===
First round
1	(Dominican Republic) V Estrella Burgos	6	6
(Spain) E López-Pérez	4	4
WC	(United States) Joseph Correa	0	1
WC	(United States) J Witten	6	6
(Argentina) A Molteni	6^{2}	4
(Argentina) E Schwank	7^{7}	6
(Dominican Republic) J Hernández	6^{5}	6^{0}
8	(Colombia) C Salamanca	7^{7}	7^{7}
4	(Argentina) R Olivo	7^{7}	6
WC	(Ecuador) G Lapentti	6^{3}	3
Q	(Chile) Bastían Malla	6^{2}	2
Q	(Chile) C Garín	7^{7}	6
Alt	(Argentina) M Estévez	4	6^{5}
(Brazil) J Pereira	6	7^{7}
(Colombia) N Barrientos	3	3
6	(Venezuela) D Souto	6	6

Second round
1	(Dominican Republic) V Estrella Burgos	6	6
(United States) J Witten	4	4
(Argentina) E Schwank	4	6	6^{8}
8	(Colombia) C Salamanca	6	3	7^{10}
4	(Argentina) R Olivo	6	6
Q	(Chile) C Garín	3	4
(Brazil) J Pereira	4	6	6
6	(Venezuela) D Souto	6	4	2

Quarterfinals
1	(Dominican Republic) V Estrella Burgos	6
8	(Colombia) C Salamanca	5^{r}
4	(Argentina) R Olivo	6	7^{7}
(Brazil) J Pereira	4	6^{3}

Semifinals
1	(Dominican Republic) V Estrella Burgos	7^{7}	4	6
4	(Argentina) R Olivo	6^{3}	6	3

=== Bottom half ===
First round
7	(Argentina) A Collarini	5	6	6
Q	(Argentina) G Durán	7	4	4
(United States) C Buchanan	4	1
WC	(Ecuador) JC Campozano	6	6
Q	(Colombia) E Struvay	7	5	2
(Argentina) JI Londero	5	7	6
(Bolivia) H Dellien	6	6
3	(Argentina) M Alund	3	4
5	(Austria) G Melzer	6	6
(France) TK Wang	2	4
(Argentina) M Trungelliti	4	6	7^{7}
(Italy) A Giannessi	6	3	6^{3}
(Brazil) F Romboli	3	3
(Ecuador) E Gómez	6	6
(Chile) G Lama	3	2
2	(Slovakia) A Martin	6	6

Second round
7	(Argentina) A Collarini	5	6	6
WC	(Ecuador) JC Campozano	7	2	4
(Argentina) JI Londero	6	7
(Bolivia) H Dellien	3	5
5	(Austria) G Melzer	2	2
(Argentina) M Trungelliti	6	6
(Ecuador) E Gómez	6	2	7
2	(Slovakia) A Martin	2	6	5

Quarterfinals
7	(Argentina) A Collarini	6	6
(Argentina) JI Londero	2	2
(Argentina) M Trungelliti	6	3	5
(Ecuador) E Gómez	4	6	7

Semifinals
7	(Argentina) A Collarini	6^{3}	7^{7}	6
(Ecuador) E Gómez	7^{7}	6^{3}	4
