= 2012 Challenger ATP de Salinas Diario Expreso =

- Date: February 27 – March 4
- Edition: 17th
- Location: Salinas, Ecuador

Champions

Singles
- (Argentina) Guido Pella

Doubles
- (Argentina) Martín Alund / (Argentina) Horacio Zeballos
- Challenger ATP de Salinas Diario Expreso

The 2012 Challenger ATP de Salinas Diario Expreso was a professional tennis tournament played on hard courts. It was the 17th edition of the tournament which was part of the 2012 ATP Challenger Tour. It took place in Salinas, Ecuador between February 27 and March 4, 2012.

== ATP entrants ==
=== Seeds ===
Country	Player	Rank^{1}	Seed
ESP	Daniel Gimeno Traver	100	1
ITA	Paolo Lorenzi	102	2
ARG	Horacio Zeballos	116	3
FRA	Augustin Gensse	160	4
FRA	Guillaume Rufin	180	5
ESP	Iván Navarro	196	6
DOM	Víctor Estrella	199	7
ARG	Martín Alund	217	8

- Rankings are as of February 20, 2012.

=== Other entrants ===
The following players received wildcards into the singles main draw:

- (Ecuador) Júlio César Campozano
- (Ecuador) Juan Carvajal
- (Ecuador) Diego Hidalgo
- (Ecuador) Juan-Sebastian Vivanco

The following players received entry from the qualifying draw:

- (Argentina) Guillermo Durán
- (Ecuador) Iván Endara
- (Argentina) Maximiliano Estévez
- (United States) Kevin Kim

== Champions ==
=== Singles ===
(Argentina) Guido Pella def. (Italy) Paolo Lorenzi, 1–6, 7–5, 6–3

=== Doubles ===
(Argentina) Martín Alund / (Argentina) Horacio Zeballos def. (Uruguay) Ariel Behar / (Colombia) Carlos Salamanca, 6–3, 6–3
