= 2014 Challenger ATP de Salinas Diario Expreso – Doubles =

Doubles
- 2014 Challenger ATP de Salinas Diario Expreso

Final
- Champion: (Venezuela) Roberto Maytín (Brazil) Fernando Romboli
- Runner-up: (Bolivia) Hugo Dellien (Argentina) Eduardo Schwank
- Score: 6–3, 6–4

Events
Singles	Doubles
- Challenger ATP de Salinas Diario Expreso

Sergio Galdós and Marco Trungelliti were the defending champions, but Trungelliti decided not to compete. Galdós plays alongside Ariel Behar.

Roberto Maytín and Fernando Romboli won the title, defeating Hugo Dellien and Eduardo Schwank in the final, 6–3, 6–4.

== Seeds ==
1. (Colombia) Nicolás Barrientos / (Colombia) Carlos Salamanca (quarterfinals)
2. (Uruguay) Ariel Behar / (Peru) Sergio Galdós (first round)
3. (Peru) Duilio Beretta / (Argentina) Guillermo Durán (quarterfinals)
4. (Brazil) Fabiano de Paula / (Argentina) Renzo Olivo (quarterfinals)

== Draw ==
Key

- Q = Qualifier
- WC = Wild card
- LL = Lucky loser
- Alt = Alternate
- ITF = ITF entry
- PR = Protected ranking
- SR = Special ranking
- SE = Special exempt
- JE = Junior exempt
- JR = Junior Accelerator Programme entrant
- CO = College Accelerator Programme entrant
- NG = Next Gen Accelerator Program entrant
- w/o = Walkover
- r = Retired
- d = Defaulted

=== Draw ===
First round
1	(Colombia) N Barrientos (Colombia) C Salamanca	2	6	[12]
(Spain) E López Pérez (Brazil) F Neis	6	3	[10]
(Venezuela) R Maytin (Brazil) F Romboli	6	6
WC	(United States) Sam Barnett (United States) J Witten	3	4
4	(Brazil) F de Paula (Argentina) R Olivo	6	6
WC	(United States) Joseph Correa (United States) Chase Perez-Blanco	0	2
(Italy) A Giannessi (Slovakia) A Martin	6	3	[9]
(Argentina) M Alund (Argentina) A Molteni	3	6	[11]
(Bolivia) H Dellien (Argentina) E Schwank	6	6
(Argentina) J Londero (Colombia) E Struvay	3	1
(Dominican Republic) J Hernández (Venezuela) D Souto	2	4
3	(Peru) D Beretta (Argentina) G Durán	6	6
(Brazil) J Pereira (France) TK Wang	6	6
(United States) C Buchanan (Austria) G Melzer	1	1
WC	(Ecuador) JC Campozano (Argentina) M Estévez	6	7^{7}
2	(Uruguay) A Behar (Peru) S Galdós	4	6^{5}

Quarterfinals
1	(Colombia) N Barrientos (Colombia) C Salamanca	2	6^{2}
(Venezuela) R Maytin (Brazil) F Romboli	6	7^{7}
4	(Brazil) F de Paula (Argentina) R Olivo	7^{7}	3	[8]
(Argentina) M Alund (Argentina) A Molteni	6^{3}	6	[10]
(Bolivia) H Dellien (Argentina) E Schwank	2	6	[10]
3	(Peru) D Beretta (Argentina) G Durán	6	3	[5]
(Brazil) J Pereira (France) TK Wang
WC	(Ecuador) JC Campozano (Argentina) M Estévez	w/o

Semifinals
(Venezuela) R Maytin (Brazil) F Romboli	6	7^{7}
(Argentina) M Alund (Argentina) A Molteni	2	6^{2}
(Bolivia) H Dellien (Argentina) E Schwank	6	6
WC	(Ecuador) JC Campozano (Argentina) M Estévez	0	1

Final
(Venezuela) R Maytin (Brazil) F Romboli	6	6
(Bolivia) H Dellien (Argentina) E Schwank	3	4
