= 98th meridian east =

Line of longitude

98th meridian east

The meridian 98° east of Greenwich is a longitude line extending from the North Pole across the Arctic Ocean, Asia, the Indian Ocean, the Southern Ocean, and Antarctica to the South Pole.

The 98th meridian east forms a great circle with the 82nd meridian west.

== From Pole to Pole ==
Starting at the North Pole and heading south to the South Pole, the 98th meridian east passes through:

Co-ordinates	Country, territory or sea	Notes
90°0′N 98°0′E	Arctic Ocean	
80°41′N 98°0′E	Russia	Krasnoyarsk Krai — Komsomolets Island, Severnaya Zemlya
80°38′N 98°0′E	Laptev Sea	
80°6′N 98°0′E	Russia	Krasnoyarsk Krai — October Revolution Island, Severnaya Zemlya
78°49′N 98°0′E	Kara Sea	
76°7′N 98°0′E	Russia	Krasnoyarsk Krai; Irkutsk Oblast — from 57°50′N 98°0′E; Tuva Republic — from 53°17′N 98°0′E
51°23′N 98°0′E	Mongolia	
50°53′N 98°0′E	Russia	Tuva Republic — For about 5 km
50°50′N 98°0′E	Mongolia	For about 13 km
50°43′N 98°0′E	Russia	Tuva Republic
50°2′N 98°0′E	Mongolia	
42°41′N 98°0′E	People's Republic of China	Inner Mongolia; Gansu — from 41°5′N 98°0′E; Qinghai — from 38°50′N 98°0′E; Sichuan — from 33°57′N 98°0′E; Tibet — from 32°24′N 98°0′E
28°17′N 98°0′E	Myanmar (Burma)	
25°16′N 98°0′E	People's Republic of China	Yunnan
24°3′N 98°0′E	Myanmar (Burma)	
19°38′N 98°0′E	Thailand	
17°30′N 98°0′E	Myanmar (Burma)	
14°17′N 98°0′E	Indian Ocean	Andaman Sea
12°23′N 98°0′E	Myanmar (Burma)	Islands in the Mergui Archipelago, including Thayawthadangyi
11°57′N 98°0′E	Indian Ocean	Andaman Sea
11°27′N 98°0′E	Myanmar (Burma)	Islands in the Mergui Archipelago
11°19′N 98°0′E	Indian Ocean	Andaman Sea — passing just west of the island of Lanbi Kyun, Myanmar (at 10°53′N 98°4′E)
10°33′N 98°0′E	Myanmar (Burma)	Islands in the Mergui Archipelago
10°19′N 98°0′E	Indian Ocean	Andaman Sea — passing just west of the island of Zadetkyi Kyun, Myanmar (at 9°54′N 98°7′E); Strait of Malacca – from 7°32′N 98°0′E
4°37′N 98°0′E	Indonesia	Island of Sumatra
2°14′N 98°0′E	Indian Ocean	Passing just east of the island of Nias, Indonesia (at 0°57′N 97°55′E); Passing just west of the Batu Islands, Indonesia (at 0°3′S 98°14′E)
60°0′S 98°0′E	Southern Ocean	
65°33′S 98°0′E	Antarctica	Australian Antarctic Territory, claimed by Australia

Next westward: 97th meridian east	98th meridian east forms a great circle with 82nd meridian west	Next eastward: 99th meridian east
