= 99th meridian east =

Line of longitude

99th meridian east

The meridian 99° east of Greenwich is a line of longitude that extends from the North Pole across the Arctic Ocean, Asia, the Indian Ocean, the Southern Ocean, and Antarctica to the South Pole.

The 99th meridian east forms a great circle with the 81st meridian west.

== From Pole to Pole ==
Starting at the North Pole and heading south to the South Pole, the 99th meridian east passes through:

| Co-ordinates | Country, territory or sea | Notes |
|---|---|---|
| 90°0′N 99°0′E | Arctic Ocean | |
| 80°45′N 99°0′E | Laptev Sea | |
| 80°3′N 99°0′E | Russia | Krasnoyarsk Krai — October Revolution Island, Severnaya Zemlya |
| 78°48′N 99°0′E | Kara Sea | |
| 76°30′N 99°0′E | Russia | Krasnoyarsk Krai; Irkutsk Oblast — from 57°44′N 99°0′E; Tuva Republic — from 53°7′N 99°0′E; Republic of Buryatia — from 52°55′N 99°0′E |
| 52°7′N 99°0′E | Mongolia | |
| 42°36′N 99°0′E | People's Republic of China | Inner Mongolia; Gansu — from 40°47′N 99°0′E; Qinghai — from 38°57′N 99°0′E; Sichuan — from 33°5′N 99°0′E; Tibet — from 30°9′N 99°0′E; Sichuan — for about 9 km from 29°47′N 99°0′E; Tibet — from 29°38′N 99°0′E; Yunnan — for about 12 km from 29°12′N 99°0′E; Tibet — for about 7 km from 29°6′N 99°0′E; Yunnan — from 29°1′N 99°0′E |
| 23°10′N 99°0′E | Myanmar (Burma) | |
| 19°46′N 99°0′E | Thailand | Passing through Chiang Mai at around 18°48'N |
| 14°1′N 99°0′E | Myanmar (Burma) | |
| 10°50′N 99°0′E | Thailand | |
| 7°53′N 99°0′E | Strait of Malacca | Passing just west of Ko Lanta Yai island, Thailand (at 7°38′N 99°1′E); Passing just west of Ko Rawi island, Thailand (at 6°32′N 99°10′E) |
| 3°39′N 99°0′E | Indonesia | Island of Sumatra |
| 0°49′N 99°0′E | Indian Ocean | Passing just east of the island of Pini, Indonesia (at 0°6′N 98°51′E) |
| 1°10′S 99°0′E | Indonesia | Island of Siberut |
| 1°46′S 99°0′E | Indian Ocean | |
| 60°0′S 99°0′E | Southern Ocean | |
| 65°47′S 99°0′E | Antarctica | Australian Antarctic Territory, claimed by Australia |

| Next westward: 98th meridian east | 99th meridian east forms a great circle with 81st meridian west | Next eastward: 100th meridian east |
