= Juan Sebastián Vivanco =

Ecuadorian tennis player

- Country (sports): Ecuador
- Born: 14 April 1990 (age 36) Quito, Ecuador
- Plays: Right Handed (Double Handed Forehand)
- Prize money: $14,624 USD

Singles
- Career record: 0-1 (ATP Tour level, Grand Slam level, and Davis Cup)
- Career titles: 0
- Highest ranking: No. 706 (November 21, 2011)
- Current ranking: No. 714 (January 30, 2012)

Doubles
- Career record: 0-0 (ATP Tour level, Grand Slam level, and Davis Cup)
- Career titles: 0
- Highest ranking: 642 (November 21, 2011)
- Last updated on: January 30, 2012.

Juan Sebastián Vivanco (born April 14, 1990) is a tennis player from Ecuador. He is a member of the 2011 Ecuadorian Davis Cup team.

== Sources ==
- Juan-Sebastian Vivanco at the Association of Tennis Professionals
- Juan-Sebastian Vivanco at World Tennis
