= Cayetano March =

Ecuadorian tennis player

Antonio Cayetano March
- Country (sports): Ecuador
- Born: 3 July 2000 (age 25)
- Prize money: $41,922

Singles
- Career record: 1–1 (at ATP Tour level, Grand Slam level, and in Davis Cup)
- Career titles: 0
- Highest ranking: No. 655 (14 September 2020)

Doubles
- Career record: 0–0 (at ATP Tour level, Grand Slam level, and in Davis Cup)
- Career titles: 0
- Highest ranking: No. 510 (25 April 2022)

Antonio Cayetano March (born 3 July 2000), often referred to simply as Cayetano March, is an Ecuadorian tennis player.

March has a career high ATP singles ranking of 655 achieved on 14 September 2020. He also has a career high ATP doubles ranking of 510 achieved on 25 April 2022.

March has 1 ITF singles title.

March represents Ecuador at the Davis Cup, where he has a W/L record of 1–0.

== World Tour and Challenger finals ==
=== Singles 1 (1–0) ===
Legend (doubles) ATP Challenger Tour (0–0) ITF World Tour (1–0)	Titles by surface Hard (0–0) Clay (1–0) Grass (0–0) Carpet (0–0)

Result	W–L	Date	Tournament	Tier	Surface	Opponent	Score
Win	1–0	Apr 2019	M15 Guayaquil, Ecuador	World Tennis Tour	Clay	(Hungary) Matyas Füle	6–4, 6–4

=== Doubles 3 (0–3) ===
Legend (doubles) ATP Challenger Tour (0–1) ITF Futures Tour (0–2)	Titles by surface Hard (0–3) Clay (0–0) Grass (0–0) Carpet (0–0)

Result	W–L	Date	Tournament	Tier	Surface	Partner	Opponents	Score
Loss	0–1	Dec 2019	M15 Santa Marta, Colombia	World Tennis Tour	Hard	(Colombia) Alejandro Hoyos Franco	(Colombia) Nicolás Barrientos (Colombia) Alejandro Gómez	3–4, 4–6
Loss	0–2	Dec 2019	M15 Santo Domingo, Dominican Republic	World Tennis Tour	Hard	(Chile) Gonzalo Lama	(Dominican Republic) Nick Hardt (Japan) Shintaro Mochizuki	3–6, 3–6
Loss	0–3	May 2021	Salinas, Ecuador	Challenger	Hard	(Argentina) Thiago Agustín Tirante	(Colombia) Nicolás Barrientos (Peru) Sergio Galdós	w/o
