= Salinas, Ecuador =

Salinas
- City
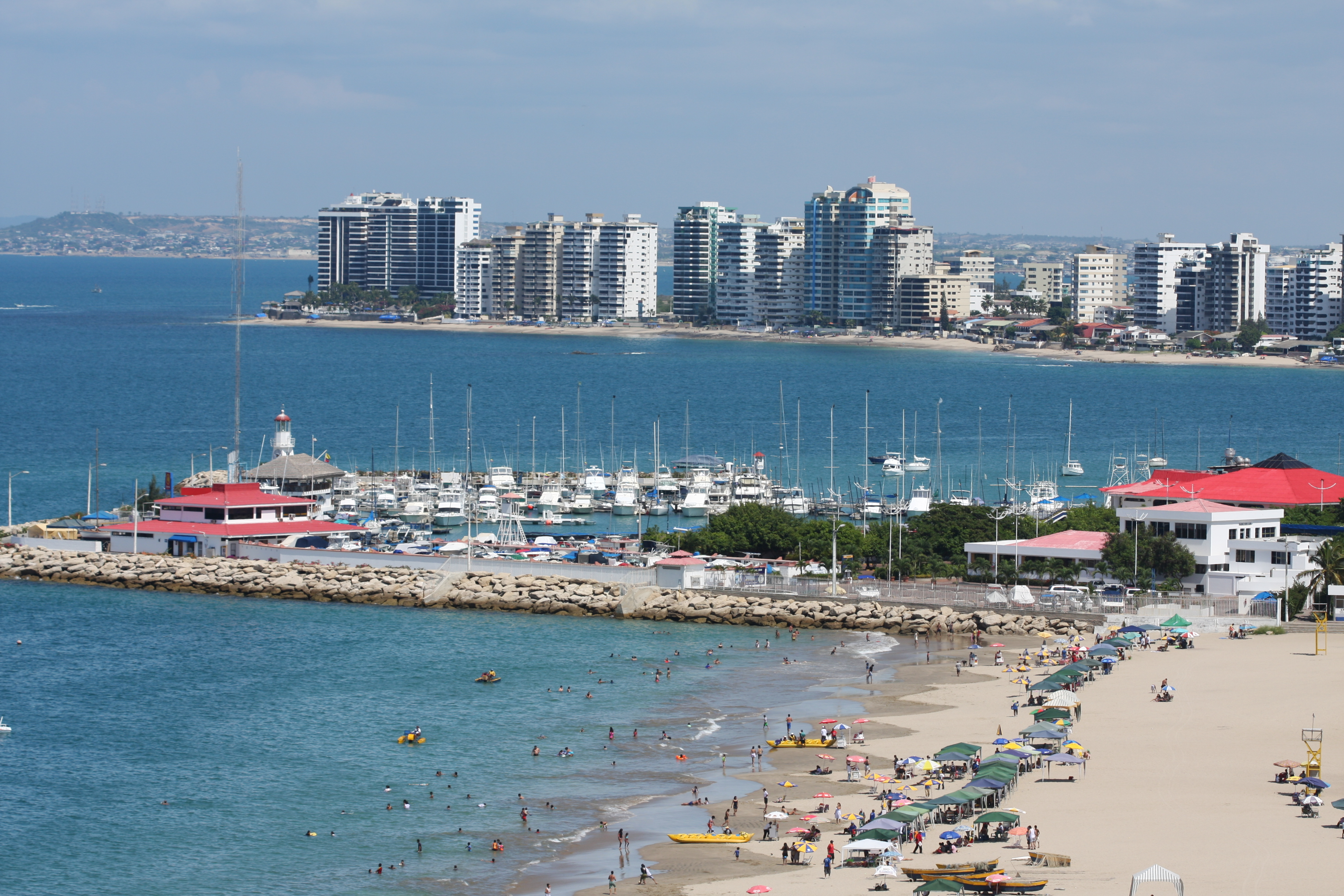
- View of Playa Chipipe

- Location within Ecuador
- Coordinates: 2°13′00.12″S 80°57′00.24″W
- Country: Ecuador
- Province: Santa Elena
- Canton: Salinas
- Parishes: List of urban parishes: Alberto Enriquez Gallo; Carlos Espinoza Larrea; Santa Rosa; Vicente Rocafuerte

Government
  - Mayor: Dennis Córdova

Area
  - City: 13.38 km^{2} (5.17 sq mi)
  - Metro: 73.5 km^{2} (28.4 sq mi)

Population (2022 census)
  - City: 35,066
  - Density: 2,621/km^{2} (6,788/sq mi)
  - Metro: 200,000
- (incl. La Libertad and Santa Elena)
- Time zone: UTC-5 (ECT)
- Climate: BWh
- Website: http://www.salinas.gob.ec/

Salinas is a coastal city located in the Province of Santa Elena, Ecuador. It is the seat of the canton that bears its name. The westernmost city on mainland Ecuador, Salinas is an important tourist center. Salinas, Ecuador's largest coastal resort, offers one of the country's best real estate investment markets and most popular and most upscale beach lifestyle. It was the site of the ISA World Junior Surfing Games Ecuador in 2009. There are two major yacht clubs in Salinas, the first is Salinas Yacht Club, which is smaller than the Puerto Lucia Yacht Club, in Santa Elena, in an area known as 'La Libertad' which, in Spanish means 'The Freedom Town'. Puerto Lucia boasts a hotel, several restaurants, a private beach and apartment buildings, as well as the large marina and port.

It was a small fishing village until June 30, 1929, when it was established as the rural parish of Santa Elena. On December 22, 1937, an official decree was signed by the Commander in Chief, General Alberto Enriquez Gallo and published in Official Gazette No. 52 of December 27 of that year, that elevated the parish to the rank of canton. Its cantonal head is the town of Salinas, and is composed of the rural parishes Ancon, and Jose Luis Tamayo Anconcito (Muey).

== Political division ==
Salinas is divided into four urban parishes. They are:

- Alberto Enriquez Gallo
- Carlos Espinoza Larrea
- Santa Rosa
- Vicente Rocafuerte

== Economy and attractions ==
=== Salinas Museum ===
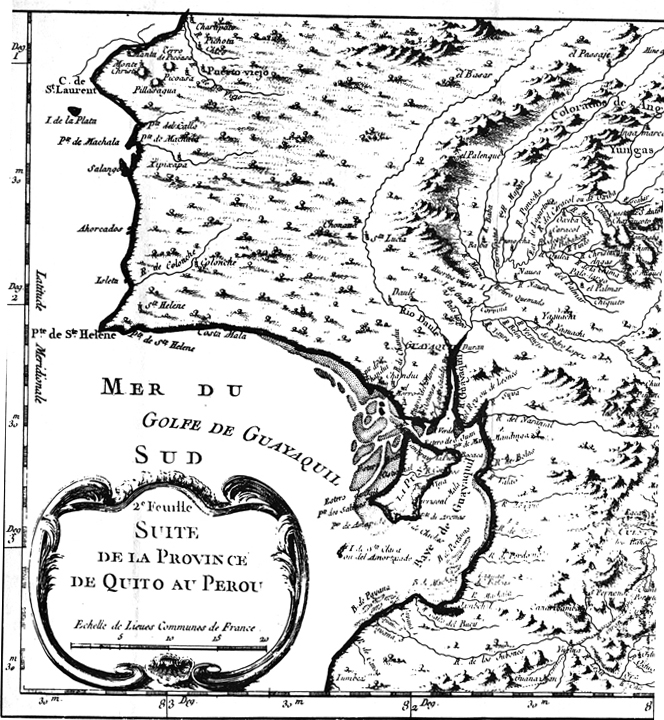
Map of the coast of Ecuador in the eighteenth century

The museum is located in Salinas Guayas, Malecon and Quil streets and is known as "The Museum of the Great Peninsula". It has an archaeological room, a temporary exhibition hall, a lounge, and a naval parade.

The Archaeological room has a complete sample of the cultures that settled in this large peninsula. Represented are the Valdivia culture (3500 - 1500 BC), the Machalilla culture (1500 - 1100 BC), and the later Engoroy variant of the Chorrera culture. Also the Jambelí Guangala Regional Development period (500 BC - 500), and maintenance-Integration Guancavilca period (500-1530) are represented. The finds shown include human and animal figurines, ceremonial and utilitarian vessels, bottles, whistles, stone axes, beads and necklaces made of Spondylus shells, horns, and a variety of both cylindrical and flat seals.

On displays is a model of a raft - Guancavilca Manteña - reproduced according to the description of Samano 1526. The Guancavilcas large rafts were in their black-colored vessels, hands and stone metate for grinding grains, spherical stone weights for nets and pointed to the divers who were also used to hit and release Spondylus shells attached to rocks; copper objects such as axes and hatchets handle coins and Spondylus shell accounts, circular and rectangular shapes that were marketed along with the copper material, in Mexico and Peru, are evidence of the last thousand years of navigation our country. A model that reproduces the galleon Jesus Maria de la Limpia Concepcion known as "The Captain" takes us back to colonial times and the exhibit showcases the salvage in that galleon wrecked in 1654 off the coast of Chanduy.

Coins of 1, 2, 4 and 8 reales (cobs or crushed calls)? were made in silver and transported on ships to Panama and from there to the Caribbean to be transported to Europe, fragments of silver cutlery and plates and pottery is known as majolica bars, tin, silver, cannonballs both bronze, and iron and lead for muskets.

A gold cross with Latin inscriptions, an earring with pearl bases, burner and silver candelabra, a buckle, metal earrings agate and correspond to the material used for personal use by the passengers on this ship that ran aground off the coast of the town of El Real.

=== Punta Carnero Beach ===
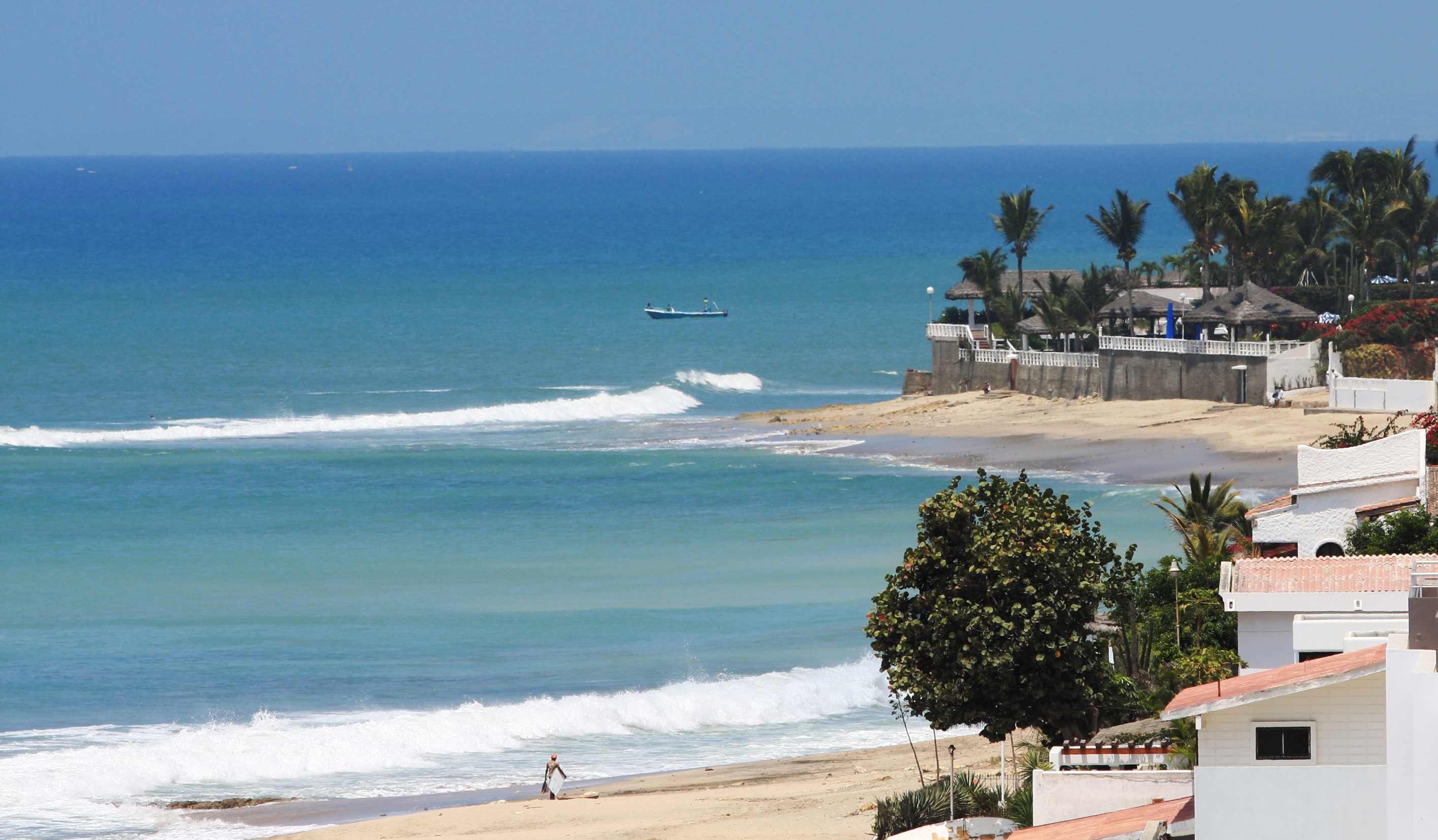
Photo of the beach in Salinas

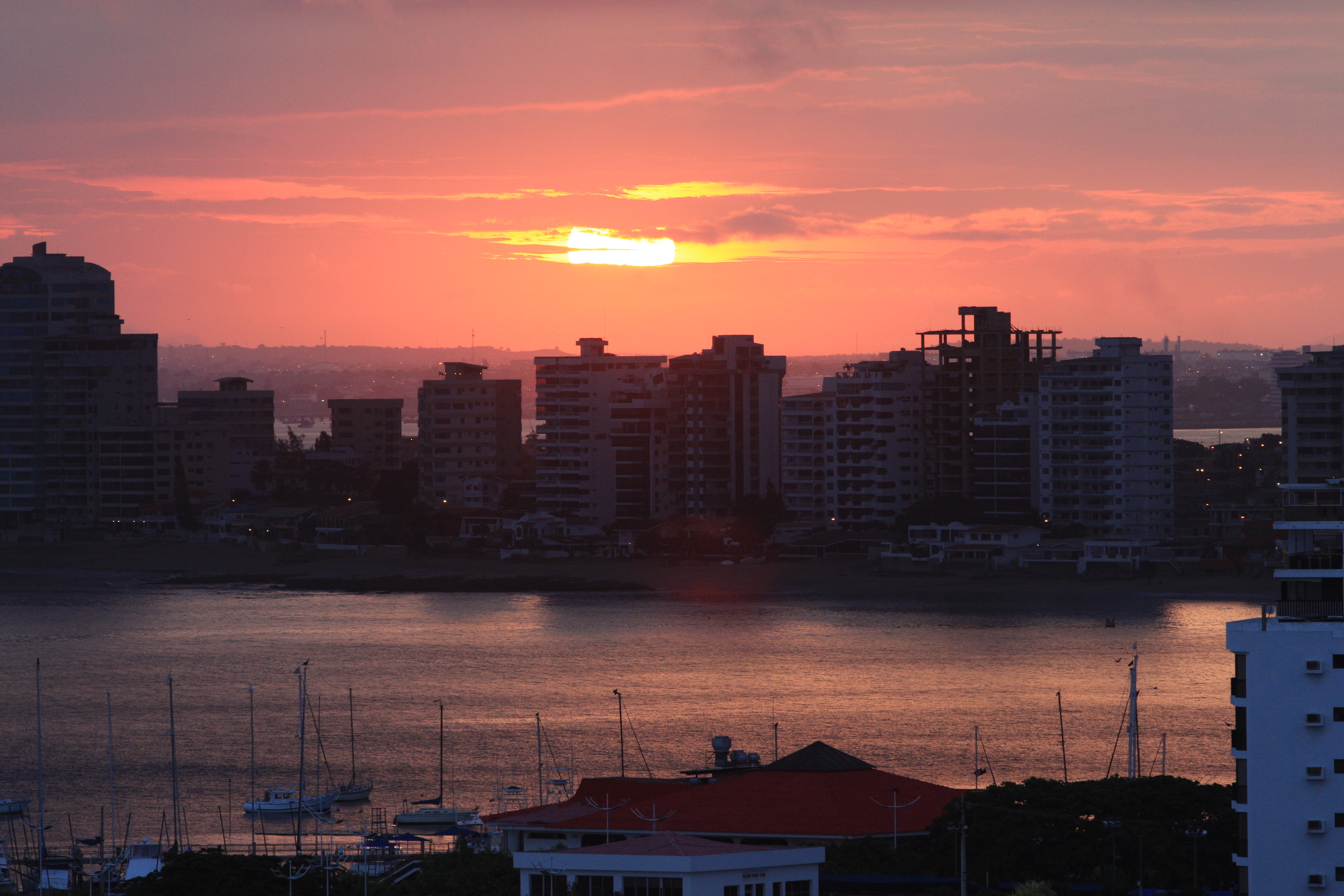
Sun setting in Salinas

People travel from all over the world because the surfing in Ecuador offers an ideal climate all year round. Punta Carnero is a beach located approximately ten minutes south of Salinas. Its name, "Ram Point" in English, stems from the rocky headland located at the southeast end of the beach. Punta Carnero Beach has been chosen many times to be the venue of not just national surf competitions, but also at an international level.

The beach extends for approximately 1.6 miles (2.6 km) and is relatively wide, with white to gray sand, medium waves and a prevalent inland breeze.

=== Other attractions ===
Other attractions include:

- The diving on the island of Peel in Ayangue
- Deep-sea fishing
- La Chocolatera, a large cliff that is the most salient point of the Peninsula of Santa Elena where the north and south moving currents collide, giving the waters a rich brown color

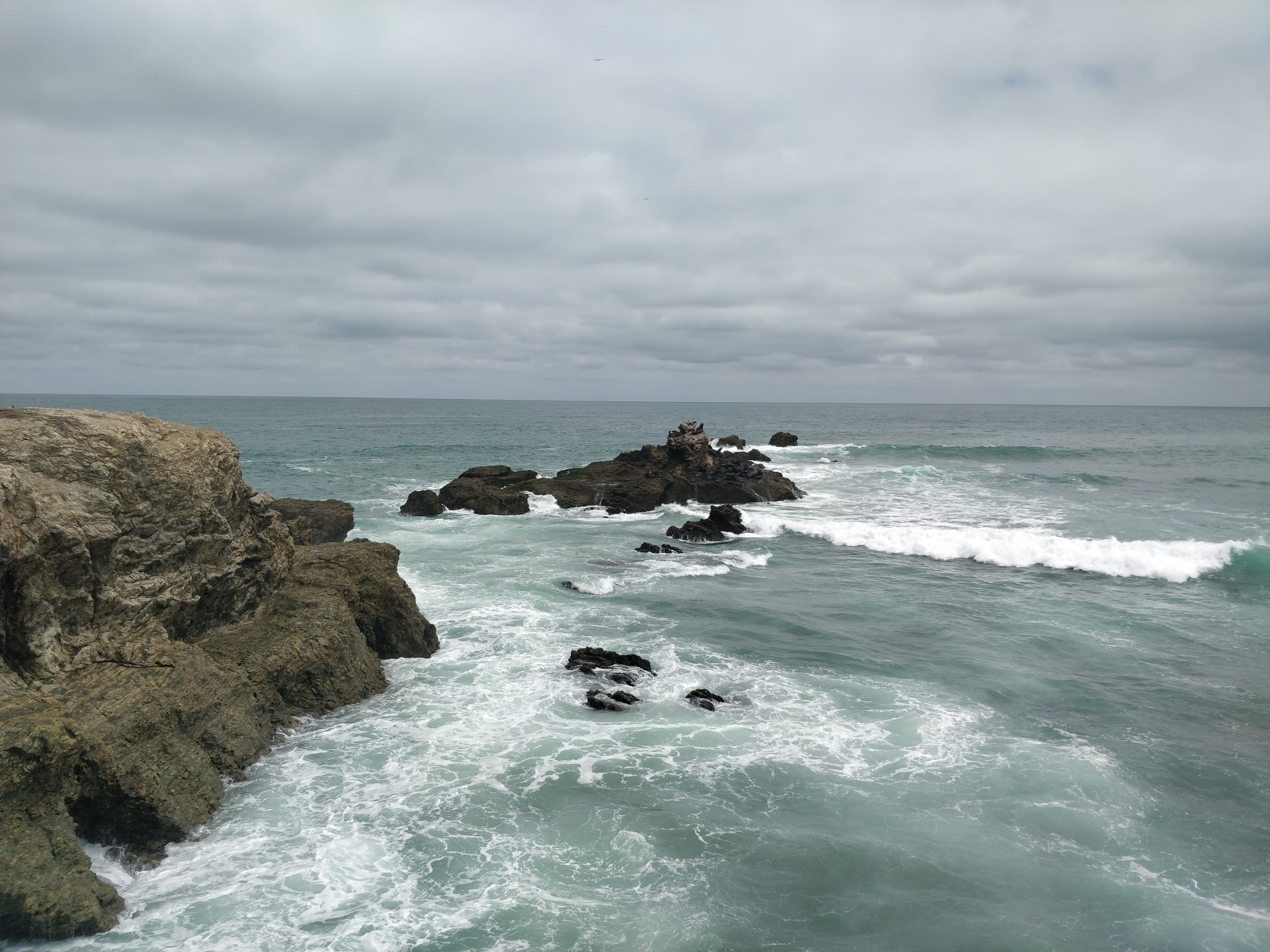
Sea lions at La Chocolatera

- Central Church of Our Lady of Mercy
- Main Salinas Malecon and Chipipe
- San Lorenzo Park Civic
- Paseo Artesanal Los Cedros
- Malecón de Santa Rosa
- Park and Central Church of José Luis Tamayo
- Pacific Mall
- Anconcito Malecon
- Whale Museum
- Whale watching
- Parasailing
- General Ulpiano Paez Airport

== Geography ==
=== Climate ===
Salinas has a warm and dry hot arid climate (Köppen BWh). Although the city is located in a tropical zone near the Equator, the weather closely resembles a subtropical climate, being very warm and dry rather than hot, humid, and rainy. This is due to the Humboldt Current, which lower temperatures for most of the year, except in the southern summer months, when the temperature rises.

Climate data for Salinas (General Ulpiano Paez Airport), elevation 8 m (26 ft), (2016–2025)
Month	Jan	Feb	Mar	Apr	May	Jun	Jul	Aug	Sep	Oct	Nov	Dec	Year
Mean daily maximum °C (°F)	28.2 (82.8)	29.1 (84.4)	29.3 (84.7)	28.4 (83.1)	27.1 (80.8)	25.4 (77.7)	24.1 (75.4)	23.7 (74.7)	24.1 (75.4)	24.2 (75.6)	24.8 (76.6)	26.3 (79.3)	26.2 (79.2)
Daily mean °C (°F)	26.4 (79.5)	27.2 (81.0)	27.4 (81.3)	26.5 (79.7)	25.4 (77.7)	24.0 (75.2)	22.9 (73.2)	22.3 (72.1)	22.6 (72.7)	22.7 (72.9)	23.2 (73.8)	24.6 (76.3)	24.6 (76.3)
Mean daily minimum °C (°F)	24.5 (76.1)	25.3 (77.5)	25.6 (78.1)	24.5 (76.1)	23.8 (74.8)	22.6 (72.7)	21.7 (71.1)	21.0 (69.8)	21.0 (69.8)	21.2 (70.2)	21.7 (71.1)	22.9 (73.2)	23.0 (73.4)
Average precipitation mm (inches)	17 (0.7)	28 (1.1)	49 (1.9)	14 (0.6)	1 (0.0)	1 (0.0)	0 (0)	0 (0)	0 (0)	1 (0.0)	0 (0)	0 (0)	111 (4.3)
Average relative humidity (%)	80.0	81.5	81.8	81.8	82.2	83.0	84.7	85.0	83.8	83.3	81.8	80.8	82.5
Source 1: IEM
Source 2: FAO (precipitation 1971–2000)
