= Challenger de Salinas =

Tennis tournament in Ecuador

Salinas Challenger
- 2023 Salinas Challenger

Defunct tennis tournament
- Event name: Challenger ATP de Salinas Diario Expreso (1996–2014); Challenger de Salinas (2021–2023)
- Location: Salinas, Ecuador
- Venue: Salinas Golf y Tenis Club
- Category: ATP Challenger Tour
- Surface: Hard (1996–2010); Clay (2011–2014); Hard (2021–2023)
- Draw: 32S/24Q/16D
- Prize money: $ 53,120 (2022)
- Website: challengersalinas.com/

Current champions (2023)
- Singles: (Ukraine) Illya Marchenko
- Doubles: (United States) Vasil Kirkov (United States) Alfredo Perez

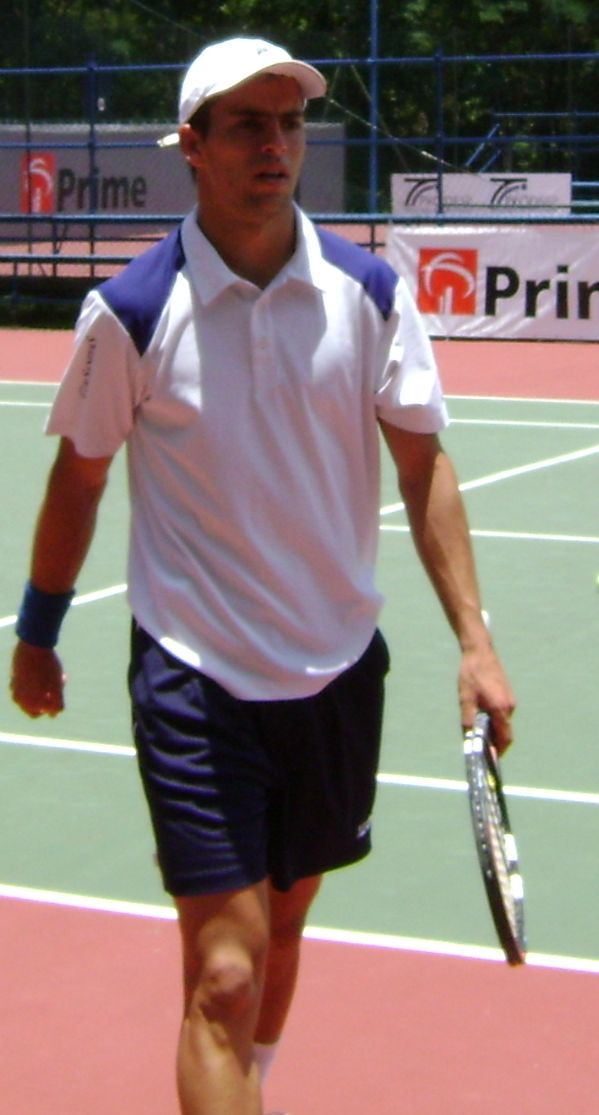
Santiago Giraldo of Colombia, took the title over American Michael Russell in 2009.

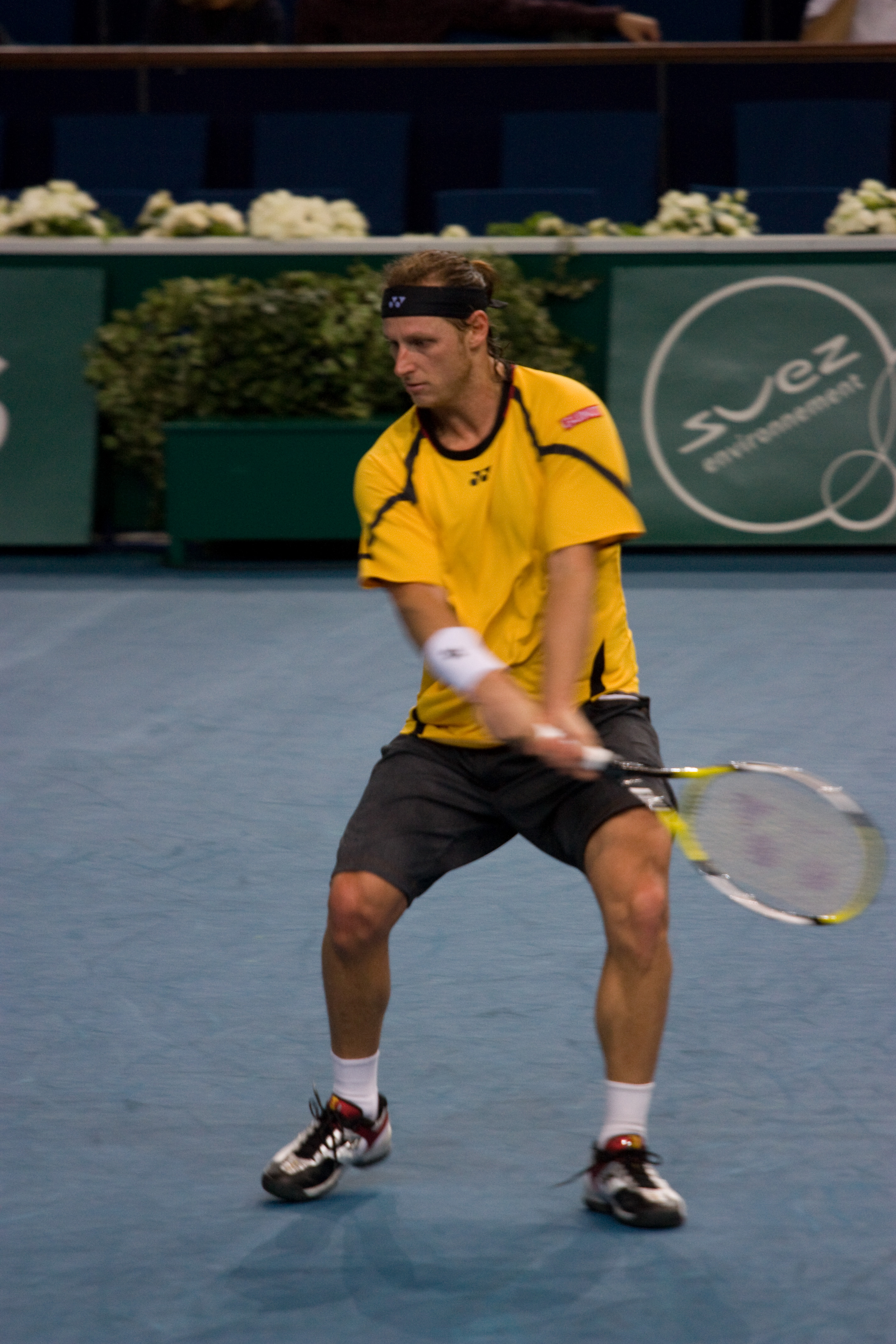
Argentine David Nalbandian, like Sá and Brzezicki, won both the singles and the doubles titles (partnering Peruvian Luis Horna), in 2001.

The Salinas Challenger (previously known as Challenger ATP de Salinas Diario Expreso) was a professional tennis tournament played on outdoor hardcourts. It was part of the ATP Challenger Tour. It was held annually in Salinas, Ecuador, from 1996 to 2014. After a hiatus, it came back in 2021, and it was played on hardcourt instead of red clay until 2023.

David Nalbandian was the only one to have won both singles and doubles titles in the same year

== Past finals ==
=== Singles ===
Year	Champion	Runner-up	Score
2023	(Ukraine) Illya Marchenko	(Croatia) Matija Pecotić	6–4, 6–4
2022	(Ecuador) Emilio Gómez (2)	(United States) Nicolas Moreno de Alboran	6–7^{(2–7)}, 7–6^{(7–4)}, 7–5
2021 (2)	(Ecuador) Emilio Gómez (1)	(Chile) Nicolás Jarry	4–6, 7–6^{(8–6)}, 6–4
2021 (1)	(Chile) Nicolás Jarry	(Colombia) Nicolás Mejía	7–6^{(9–7)}, 6–1
2015–2020	Not Held		
2014	(Dominican Republic) Víctor Estrella	(Argentina) Andrea Collarini	6–3, 6–4
2013	(Colombia) Alejandro González	(Argentina) Renzo Olivo	4–6, 6–3, 7–6^{(9–7)}
2012	(Argentina) Guido Pella	(Italy) Paolo Lorenzi	1–6, 7–5, 6–3
2011	(Argentina) Andrés Molteni	(Argentina) Horacio Zeballos	7–5, 7–6^{(7–4)}
2010	(Argentina) Brian Dabul	(Chile) Nicolás Massú	6–3, 6–2
2009	(Colombia) Santiago Giraldo	(United States) Michael Russell	6–3, 6–2
2008	(Peru) Iván Miranda (2)	(Argentina) Diego Junqueira	6–2, 6–2
2007	(Argentina) Juan Pablo Brzezicki	(Brazil) Marcos Daniel	6–4, 6–4
2006	(Germany) Benjamin Becker	(United States) Jesse Witten	4–6, 6–3, 6–2
2005	(Netherlands) Dennis van Scheppingen	(Brazil) Franco Ferreiro	6–2, 6–4
2004	(Colombia) Alejandro Falla	(Luxembourg) Gilles Müller	6–7^{(6–8)}, 6–2, 6–2
2003	(Ecuador) Giovanni Lapentti	(Peru) Iván Miranda	6–3, 6–4
2002	(Peru) Iván Miranda (1)	(Brazil) Ricardo Mello	6–3, 6–4
2001	(Argentina) David Nalbandian	(Haiti) Ronald Agénor	6–4, 6–2
2000	(Italy) Davide Sanguinetti	(Peru) Luis Horna	6–2, 6–2
1999	(Argentina) Juan Ignacio Chela	(Argentina) Hernán Gumy	6–4, 7–6
1998	(Brazil) André Sá	(Argentina) Guillermo Cañas	7–5, 5–7, 6–4
1997	(Germany) Oliver Gross	(Austria) Gilbert Schaller	6–1, 3–6, 6–2
1996	(Spain) Óscar Martínez	(Ecuador) Luis Morejón	6–2, 6–7, 6–3

=== Doubles ===
Year	Champions	Runners-up	Score
2023	(United States) Vasil Kirkov (United States) Alfredo Perez	(Ecuador) Ángel Díaz Jalil (Ecuador) Álvaro Guillén Meza	7–5, 7–5
2022	(India) Yuki Bhambri (India) Saketh Myneni	(United States) JC Aragone (Ecuador) Roberto Quiroz	4–6, 6–3, [10–7]
2021 (2)	(Colombia) Nicolás Barrientos (Peru) Sergio Galdós (2)	(Ecuador) Antonio Cayetano March (Argentina) Thiago Agustín Tirante	Walkover
2021 (1)	(Mexico) Miguel Ángel Reyes-Varela (Brazil) Fernando Romboli (2)	(Ecuador) Diego Hidalgo (Tunisia) Skander Mansouri	7–5, 4–6, [10–2]
2015–2020	Not Held		
2014	(Venezuela) Roberto Maytín (Brazil) Fernando Romboli (1)	(Bolivia) Hugo Dellien (Argentina) Eduardo Schwank	6–3, 6–4
2013	(Peru) Sergio Galdós (1) (Argentina) Marco Trungelliti	(South Africa) Jean Andersen (South Africa) Izak van der Merwe	6–4, 6–4
2012	(Argentina) Martín Alund (Argentina) Horacio Zeballos	(Uruguay) Ariel Behar (Colombia) Carlos Salamanca	6–3, 6–3
2011	(Argentina) Facundo Bagnis (Argentina) Federico Delbonis	(Brazil) Rogério Dutra da Silva (Brazil) João Souza	6–2, 6–1
2010	(United Kingdom) Jonathan Marray (United Kingdom) Jamie Murray	(Thailand) Sanchai Ratiwatana (Thailand) Sonchat Ratiwatana	6–3, 6–4
2009	(Thailand) Sanchai Ratiwatana (Thailand) Sonchat Ratiwatana	(Argentina) Juan Pablo Brzezicki (Peru) Iván Miranda	6–3, 7–6^{(7–4)}
2008	(Brazil) Júlio Silva (1) (Brazil) Caio Zampieri	(Argentina) Sebastián Decoud (Belgium) Dick Norman	7–6^{(8–6)}, 6–2
2007	(United States) Scott Lipsky (United States) David Martin	(Brazil) Thiago Alves (Brazil) Franco Ferreiro	7–5, 7–6^{(11–9)}
2006	(Brazil) Thiago Alves (Brazil) Júlio Silva (1)	(Brazil) André Ghem (Brazil) Alexandre Simoni	3–6, 6–4, 10–4
2005	(Argentina) Juan Pablo Brzezicki (Argentina) Cristian Villagrán	(Argentina) Juan Pablo Guzmán (Argentina) Sergio Roitman	6–2, 6–4
2004	(Argentina) Federico Browne (Pakistan) Aisam-ul-Haq Qureshi	(Venezuela) José de Armas (United States) Eric Nunez	6–3, 6–3
2003	(Argentina) Martín García (Argentina) Sebastián Prieto (2)	(Germany) Michael Kohlmann (Israel) Harel Levy	walkover
2002	(United States) Brandon Coupe (United States) Jeff Salzenstein	(Argentina) Martín Rodríguez (Argentina) Diego Veronelli	6–7^{(3–7)}, 6–4, 7–6^{(7–3)}
2001	(Peru) Luis Horna (Argentina) David Nalbandian	(Brazil) Daniel Melo (Brazil) Flávio Saretta	6–4, 0–6, 6–1
2000	(Spain) Juan Balcells (Colombia) Mauricio Hadad	(Spain) Emilio Benfele Álvarez (Spain) Álex Calatrava	walkover
1999	(Argentina) Mariano Hood (Argentina) Sebastián Prieto (1)	(Argentina) Lucas Arnold Ker (Argentina) Daniel Orsanic	6–2, 7–6
1998	(United States) David DiLucia (United States) Michael Sell	(Argentina) Mariano Hood (Argentina) Sebastián Prieto	7–6, 6–4
1997	(Brazil) Fernando Meligeni (Brazil) André Sá	(United States) Donald Johnson (United States) Francisco Montana	6–3, 3–6, 6–3
1996	(Venezuela) Juan Carlos Bianchi (Ivory Coast) Claude N'Goran	(Argentina) Daniel Orsanic (Italy) Laurence Tieleman	7–5, 6–4
