= 84th meridian west =

Line of longitude

84th meridian west

The meridian 84° west of Greenwich is a line of longitudethat extends from the North Pole across the Arctic Ocean, North America, the Gulf of Mexico, the Caribbean Sea, Central America, the Pacific Ocean, the Southern Ocean, and Antarctica to the South Pole.

The 84th meridian west forms a great circle with the 96th meridian east.

== From Pole to Pole ==
Starting at the North Pole and heading south to the South Pole, the 84th meridian west passes through:

Co-ordinates	Country, territory or sea	Notes
90°0′N 84°0′W	Arctic Ocean	
82°22′N 84°0′W	Canada	Nunavut — Ellesmere Island and Landslip Island
76°25′N 84°0′W	Jones Sound	
75°49′N 84°0′W	Canada	Nunavut — Devon Island
74°32′N 84°0′W	Lancaster Sound	
73°31′N 84°0′W	Canada	Nunavut — Baffin Island
69°59′N 84°0′W	Fury and Hecla Strait	
69°46′N 84°0′W	Canada	Nunavut — Melville Peninsula (mainland) and Vansittart Island
65°45′N 84°0′W	Foxe Basin	
65°11′N 84°0′W	Canada	Nunavut — Southampton Island
63°39′N 84°0′W	Fisher Strait	
62°30′N 84°0′W	Hudson Bay	Passing just west of Coats Island, Nunavut, Canada (at 62°26′N 83°57′W)
55°16′N 84°0′W	Canada	Ontario — mainland and St. Joseph Island
46°6′N 84°0′W	United States	Michigan
45°57′N 84°0′W	Lake Huron	
45°29′N 84°0′W	United States	Michigan; Ohio — from 41°43′N 84°0′W; Kentucky — from 38°47′N 84°0′W; Tennessee — from 36°35′N 84°0′W; North Carolina — from 35°26′N 84°0′W; Georgia — from 35°0′N 84°0′W; Florida — from 30°40′N 84°0′W
30°5′N 84°0′W	Gulf of Mexico	
22°41′N 84°0′W	Cuba	
21°59′N 84°0′W	Caribbean Sea	Passing just west of the Swan Islands, Honduras (at 17°25′N 83°57′W)
15°33′N 84°0′W	Honduras	
14°45′N 84°0′W	Nicaragua	
10°45′N 84°0′W	Costa Rica	Passing just east of San José (at 9°55′N 84°4′W)
9°20′N 84°0′W	Pacific Ocean	Passing just west of Isla del Caño, Costa Rica (at 8°43′N 83°54′W)
60°0′S 84°0′W	Southern Ocean	
73°32′S 84°0′W	Antarctica	Territory claimed by Chile

== See also ==
- 83rd meridian west
- 85th meridian west
