= 97th meridian =

97th meridian may refer to:

- 97th meridian east, a line of longitude east of the Greenwich Meridian
- 97th meridian west, a line of longitude west of the Greenwich Meridian

97th meridian west	97th meridian east
