= 96th meridian =

96th meridian may refer to:

- 96th meridian east, a line of longitude east of the Greenwich Meridian
- 96th meridian west, a line of longitude west of the Greenwich Meridian

96th meridian west	96th meridian east
