= 83rd meridian west =

Line of longitude

83rd meridian west

The meridian 83° west of Greenwich is a line of longitudethat extends from the North Pole across the Arctic Ocean, North America, the Gulf of Mexico, the Caribbean Sea, Costa Rica, Panama the Pacific Ocean, the Southern Ocean, and Antarctica to the South Pole.

The 83rd meridian west forms a great circle with the 97th meridian east.

== From Pole to Pole ==
Starting at the North Pole and heading south to the South Pole, the 83rd meridian west passes through:

Co-ordinates	Country, territory or sea	Notes
90°0′N 83°0′W	Arctic Ocean	
82°17′N 83°0′W	Canada	Nunavut — Ellesmere Island
76°25′N 83°0′W	Jones Sound	
75°45′N 83°0′W	Canada	Nunavut — Devon Island
74°35′N 83°0′W	Lancaster Sound	
73°40′N 83°0′W	Canada	Nunavut — Baffin Island
69°58′N 83°0′W	Fury and Hecla Strait	
69°46′N 83°0′W	Canada	Nunavut — Liddon Island, Melville Peninsula (mainland) and Winter Island
66°12′N 83°0′W	Foxe Basin	
64°54′N 83°0′W	Canada	Nunavut — Southampton Island
63°57′N 83°0′W	Evans Strait	
62°52′N 83°0′W	Canada	Nunavut — Coats Island
62°13′N 83°0′W	Hudson Bay	
55°16′N 83°0′W	Canada	Nunavut — a small unnamed island; Ontario — from 55°13′N 85°0′W, the mainland and Manitoulin Island
45°49′N 83°0′W	Lake Huron	
44°3′N 83°0′W	United States	Michigan — passing through Detroit (at 42°20′N 83°0′W)
42°19′N 83°0′W	Canada	Ontario — passing through Windsor (42°18′N 83°0′W)
42°1′N 83°0′W	Lake Erie	
41°32′N 83°0′W	United States	Ohio — passing through Columbus: (at 39°57′N 83°0′W); Kentucky — from 38°43′N 83°0′W; Virginia — from 36°51′N 83°0′W; Tennessee — from 36°35′N 83°0′W; North Carolina — from 35°46′N 83°0′W; South Carolina — from 35°1′N 83°0′W; Georgia — from 34°28′N 83°0′W; Florida — from 30°37′N 83°0′W
29°10′N 83°0′W	Gulf of Mexico	Passing just west of the Dry Tortugas islands, Florida, United States (at 24°38′N 82°56′W)
23°1′N 83°0′W	Cuba	
22°31′N 83°0′W	Caribbean Sea	Gulf of Batabanó
21°56′N 83°0′W	Cuba	Isla de la Juventud
21°28′N 83°0′W	Caribbean Sea	Passing through the Miskito Cays, Nicaragua (at 14°23′N 83°0′W); Passing between the Corn Islands, Nicaragua (at 12°13′N 83°0′W)
9°55′N 83°0′W	Costa Rica	
8°22′N 83°0′W	Panama	For about 8 km
8°17′N 83°0′W	Costa Rica	For about 4 km
8°15′N 83°0′W	Pacific Ocean	
60°0′S 83°0′W	Southern Ocean	
73°33′S 83°0′W	Antarctica	Territory claimed by Chile

== See also ==
- 82nd meridian west
- 84th meridian west
