= 97th meridian east =

Line of longitude

97th meridian east (interactive map)

The meridian 97° east of Greenwich is a line of longitude that extends from the North Pole across the Arctic Ocean, Asia, the Indian Ocean, the Southern Ocean, and Antarctica to the South Pole.

The 97th meridian east forms a great circle with the 83rd meridian west.

== From Pole to Pole ==
Starting at the North Pole and heading south to the South Pole, the 97th meridian east passes through:

Co-ordinates	Country, territory or sea	Notes
90°0′N 97°0′E	Arctic Ocean	
80°53′N 97°0′E	Russia	Krasnoyarsk Krai — Komsomolets Island and October Revolution Island, Severnaya Zemlya
78°56′N 97°0′E	Kara Sea	
76°19′N 97°0′E	Russia	Krasnoyarsk Krai — The Nordenskiöld Archipelago and the mainland Irkutsk Oblast — from 55°51′N 97°0′E; Tuva Republic — from 53°40′N 97°0′E
49°55′N 97°0′E	Mongolia	
42°44′N 97°0′E	People's Republic of China	Gansu; Qinghai — from 39°11′N 97°0′E; Tibet — from 32°3′N 97°0′E
28°19′N 97°0′E	India	Arunachal Pradesh — partly claimed by People's Republic of China
27°42′N 97°0′E	Myanmar (Burma)	
27°19′N 97°0′E	India	Arunachal Pradesh — for about 19 km
27°8′N 97°0′E	Myanmar (Burma)	
17°16′N 97°0′E	Indian Ocean	Andaman Sea
5°15′N 97°0′E	Indonesia	Island of Sumatra
3°33′N 97°0′E	Indian Ocean	Passing just west of the Banyak Islands, Indonesia (at 2°4′N 97°4′E); Passing just west of the island of Nias, Indonesia (at 1°24′N 27°3′E); Passing just east of the Cocos (Keeling) Islands (at 12°9′S 96°56′E)
60°0′S 97°0′E	Southern Ocean	
65°10′S 97°0′E	Antarctica	Australian Antarctic Territory, claimed by Australia

Next westward: 96th meridian east	97th meridian east forms a great circle with 83rd meridian west	Next eastward: 98th meridian east
