= 96th meridian east =

Line of longitude

96th meridian east (interactive map)

The meridian 96° east of Greenwich is a line of longitude that extends from the North Pole across the Arctic Ocean, Asia, the Indian Ocean, the Southern Ocean, and Antarctica to the South Pole.

The 96th meridian east forms a great circle with the 84th meridian west.

== From Pole to Pole ==
Starting at the North Pole and heading south to the South Pole, the 96th meridian east passes through:

Co-ordinates	Country, territory or sea	Notes
90°0′N 96°0′E	Arctic Ocean	
81°10′N 96°0′E	Russia	Krasnoyarsk Krai — Komsomolets Island and October Revolution Island, Severnaya Zemlya
78°59′N 96°0′E	Kara Sea	
77°6′N 96°0′E	Russia	Krasnoyarsk Krai — The Nordenskiöld Archipelago and the mainland Irkutsk Oblast — from 54°31′N 96°0′E; Krasnoyarsk Krai — from 54°5′N 96°0′E; Tuva Republic — from 53°29′N 96°0′E
49°59′N 96°0′E	Mongolia	
43°11′N 96°0′E	China	Xinjiang; Gansu — from 41°54′N 96°0′E; Qinghai — from 38°12′N 96°0′E; Tibet — from 31°43′N 96°0′E
29°22′N 96°0′E	India	Arunachal Pradesh — partly claimed by China
27°8′N 96°0′E	Myanmar (Burma)	
16°14′N 96°0′E	Indian Ocean	Andaman Sea
5°21′N 96°0′E	Indonesia	Island of Sumatra
4°14′N 96°0′E	Indian Ocean	
2°47′N 96°0′E	Indonesia	Island of Simeulue
2°34′N 96°0′E	Indian Ocean	
60°0′S 96°0′E	Southern Ocean	
65°1′S 96°0′E	Antarctica	Australian Antarctic Territory, claimed by Australia

Next westward: 95th meridian east	96th meridian east forms a great circle with 84th meridian west	Next eastward: 97th meridian east
