= Landslip Island =

Island in Nunavut, Canada

- Location within Nunavut Location within Canada

Geography
- Location: Northern Canada
- Coordinates: 76°28′N 084°00′W
- Archipelago: Arctic Archipelago

Administration
- Canada
- Territory: Nunavut

Demographics
- Population: Uninhabited

Landslip Island is an island of the Arctic Archipelago in the territory of Nunavut. It lies at the mouth of Harbour Fiord on the Jones Sound, south of Ellesmere Island.
