= 2009 Rakuten Japan Open Tennis Championships =

- Date: 5–11 October
- Edition: 36th
- Category: ATP World Tour 500
- Surface: Hard / outdoor
- Location: Tokyo, Japan
- Venue: Ariake Coliseum

Champions

Singles
- (France) Jo-Wilfried Tsonga

Doubles
- (Austria) Julian Knowle / (Austria) Jürgen Melzer
← 2008 ·	Japan Open	· 2010 →

The 2009 Rakuten Japan Open Tennis Championships was a men's tennis tournament played on outdoor hard courts. It was the 36th edition of the event known that year as the Rakuten Japan Open Tennis Championships, and was part of the 500 Series of the 2009 ATP World Tour. It was held at the Ariake Coliseum in Tokyo, Japan, from October 5 through October 11, 2009. Second-seeded Jo-Wilfried Tsonga won the singles title.

== ATP entrants ==
=== Seeds ===
Country	Player	Rank^{1}	Seed
ARG	Juan Martín del Potro	5	1
FRA	Jo-Wilfried Tsonga	7	2
FRA	Gilles Simon	10	3
FRA	Gaël Monfils	13	4
CZE	Tomáš Berdych	16	5
CZE	Radek Štěpánek	17	6
SWI	Stanislas Wawrinka	23	7
AUS	Lleyton Hewitt	26	8

- rankings are based on the rankings of September 28, 2009

=== Other entrants ===
The following players received wildcards into the singles main draw:

- (Japan) Tatsuma Ito
- (Japan) Go Soeda
- (Japan) Takao Suzuki

The following players received entry from the qualifying draw:

- (Switzerland) Marco Chiudinelli
- (Latvia) Ernests Gulbis
- (Turkey) Marsel İlhan
- (France) Édouard Roger-Vasselin

== Finals ==
=== Singles ===
(France) Jo-Wilfried Tsonga defeated (Russia) Mikhail Youzhny, 6–3, 6–3

- It was Tsongas 3rd title of the year and 5th of his career.

=== Doubles ===
(Austria) Julian Knowle / (Austria) Jürgen Melzer defeated (United Kingdom) Ross Hutchins / (Australia) Jordan Kerr, 6–2, 5–7, [10–8]
