= 2007 AIG Japan Open Tennis Championships – Men's doubles =

Men's doubles
- 2007 AIG Japan Open Tennis Championships

Final
- Champion: (Australia) Jordan Kerr (Sweden) Robert Lindstedt
- Runner-up: (Canada) Frank Dancevic (Australia) Stephen Huss
- Score: 6–4, 6–4

Details
- Draw: 16 (2WC)
- Seeds: 4

Events
Singles	men	women
Doubles	men	women
- AIG Japan Open Tennis Championships

Ashley Fisher and Tripp Phillips were the defending champions, but Phillips chose not to participate, and only Fisher competed that year. Fisher partnered with Jim Thomas, but lost in the semifinals to Jordan Kerr and Robert Lindstedt.

Jordan Kerr and Robert Lindstedt won in the final 6–4, 6–4, against Frank Dancevic and Stephen Huss.

== Seeds ==
1. (South Africa) Jeff Coetzee / (Netherlands) Rogier Wassen (first round)
2. (United States) Eric Butorac / (Australia) Todd Perry (first round)
3. (Czech Republic) Petr Pála / (Czech Republic) David Škoch (quarterfinals)
4. (Australia) Ashley Fisher / (United States) Jim Thomas (semifinals)

== Draw ==
Key

- Q = Qualifier
- WC = Wild card
- LL = Lucky loser
- Alt = Alternate
- ITF = ITF entry
- PR = Protected ranking
- SR = Special ranking
- SE = Special exempt
- JE = Junior exempt
- JR = Junior Accelerator Programme entrant
- CO = College Accelerator Programme entrant
- NG = Next Gen Accelerator Program entrant
- w/o = Walkover
- r = Retired
- d = Defaulted

=== Draw ===
First round
1	(South Africa) J Coetzee (Netherlands) R Wassen	6^{5}	5
(Canada) F Dancevic (Australia) S Huss	7^{7}	7
(Russia) T Gabashvili (United States) V Spadea	6	7
(Italy) S Bolelli (Argentina) S Roitman	1	5
3	(Czech Republic) P Pála (Czech Republic) D Škoch	6	6
(South Africa) C Haggard (Croatia) I Karlović	4	4
(Chile) P Capdeville (Germany) R Schüttler	4	2
(United States) R Kendrick (United States) M Russell	6	6
WC	(Germany) B Becker (Japan) T Suzuki	6	7^{7}
WC	(Japan) K Nishikori (Japan) G Soeda	2	6^{5}
(United States) S Lipsky (United States) D Martin	6	2	[5]
4	(Australia) A Fisher (United States) J Thomas	2	6	[10]
(United States) A Delic (United States) J Gimelstob	7^{7}	3	[4]
(Australia) J Kerr (Sweden) R Lindstedt	6^{3}	6	[10]
(Poland) L Kubot (South Africa) W Moodie	1	6	[10]
2	(United States) E Butorac (Australia) T Perry	6	3	[4]

Quarterfinals
(Canada) F Dancevic (Australia) S Huss	3	6	[11]
(Russia) T Gabashvili (United States) V Spadea	6	2	[9]
3	(Czech Republic) P Pála (Czech Republic) D Škoch	6^{3}	5
(United States) R Kendrick (United States) M Russell	7^{7}	7
WC	(Germany) B Becker (Japan) T Suzuki	1	7^{7}	[8]
4	(Australia) A Fisher (United States) J Thomas	6	6^{4}	[10]
(Australia) J Kerr (Sweden) R Lindstedt	6	6^{5}	[10]
(Poland) L Kubot (South Africa) W Moodie	2	7^{7}	[7]

Semifinals
(Canada) F Dancevic (Australia) S Huss	7	7^{7}
(United States) R Kendrick (United States) M Russell	5	6^{4}
4	(Australia) A Fisher (United States) J Thomas	4	4
(Australia) J Kerr (Sweden) R Lindstedt	6	6

Final
(Canada) F Dancevic (Australia) S Huss	4	4
(Australia) J Kerr (Sweden) R Lindstedt	6	6
