= 2008 AIG Japan Open Tennis Championships – Men's singles =

Men's singles
- 2008 AIG Japan Open Tennis Championships

Final
- Champion: (Czech Republic) Tomáš Berdych
- Runner-up: (Argentina) Juan Martín del Potro
- Score: 6–1, 6–4

Details
- Draw: 48 (6Q / 4WC)
- Seeds: 16

Events
Singles	men	women
Doubles	men	women
← 2007 ·	Japan Open	· 2009 →

David Ferrer was the defending champion, but lost in the quarterfinals to Juan Martín del Potro.

Ninth-seeded Tomáš Berdych won in the final 6–1, 6–4, against Juan Martín del Potro.

== Seeds ==
All seeds received a bye into the second round.

1. (Spain) David Ferrer (quarterfinals)
2. (United States) Andy Roddick (semifinals)
3. (Chile) Fernando González (quarterfinals)
4. (France) Richard Gasquet (semifinals)
5. (Argentina) Juan Martín del Potro (final)
6. (Spain) Tommy Robredo (third round)
7. (France) Jo-Wilfried Tsonga (third round, retired due to an abdominal strain)
8. (Russia) Mikhail Youzhny (third round)
9. (Czech Republic) Tomáš Berdych (champion)
10. (France) Gaël Monfils (withdrew due to a right shoulder injury)
11. (Finland) Jarkko Nieminen (third round)
12. (Germany) Rainer Schüttler (quarterfinals)
13. (United States) Sam Querrey (second round)
14. (Austria) Jürgen Melzer (third round)
15. (Italy) Simone Bolelli (second round)
16. (Spain) Guillermo García López (second round)

== Draw ==
Key

- Q = Qualifier
- WC = Wild card
- LL = Lucky loser
- Alt = Alternate
- ITF = ITF entry
- PR = Protected ranking
- SR = Special ranking
- SE = Special exempt
- JE = Junior exempt
- JR = Junior Accelerator Programme entrant
- CO = College Accelerator Programme entrant
- NG = Next Gen Accelerator Program entrant
- w/o = Walkover
- r = Retired
- d = Defaulted

=== Finals ===
Quarterfinals
1	(Spain) David Ferrer	1	5
5	(Argentina) Juan Martín del Potro	6	7
4	(France) Richard Gasquet	6	6
12	(Germany) Rainer Schüttler	3	2
9	(Czech Republic) Tomáš Berdych	6	6
3	(Chile) Fernando González	0	4
(Serbia) Viktor Troicki	3	4
2	(United States) Andy Roddick	6	6

Semifinals
5	(Argentina) Juan Martín del Potro	6	4	7
4	(France) Richard Gasquet	3	6	5
9	(Czech Republic) Tomáš Berdych	6^{3}	7	7^{7}
2	(United States) Andy Roddick	7^{7}	5	6^{3}

Final
5	(Argentina) Juan Martín del Potro	1	4
9	(Czech Republic) Tomáš Berdych	6	6

=== Top half ===
==== Section 1 ====
First round
(United States) J Levine	4	6	6
Q	(Thailand) D Udomchoke	6	1	0
WC	(Japan) Y Sugita	3	6^{6}
WC	(Japan) T Suzuki	6	7^{8}
Q	(Philippines) C Mamiit	3	7	6
LL	(United States) B Evans	6	5	4
(Israel) D Sela	7	6
(Germany) B Phau	5	1

Second round
1	(Spain) D Ferrer	6	4	6
(United States) J Levine	4	6	1
WC	(Japan) T Suzuki	7^{7}	4	7^{7}
15	(Italy) S Bolelli	6^{5}	6	6^{5}
11	(Finland) J Nieminen	7^{9}	6
Q	(Philippines) C Mamiit	6^{7}	4
(Israel) D Sela	5	0
5	(Argentina) JM del Potro	7	6

Third round
1	(Spain) D Ferrer	4	6	6
WC	(Japan) T Suzuki	6	3	2
11	(Finland) J Nieminen	1	3
5	(Argentina) JM del Potro	6	6

Quarterfinals
1	(Spain) D Ferrer	1	5
5	(Argentina) JM del Potro	6	7

==== Section 2 ====
First round
Q	(Austria) M Slanar	4	6	6
(United States) D Young	6	3	2
(Japan) K Nishikori	7^{7}	6^{5}	6
(United States) R Kendrick	6^{3}	7^{7}	2
WC	(Japan) S Iwabuchi	1	4
(South Korea) H-t Lee	6	6
(Italy) F Cipolla	7^{7}	7^{7}
(Spain) I Navarro	6^{5}	6^{4}

Second round
4	(France) R Gasquet	6	6
Q	(Austria) M Slanar	4	2
(Japan) K Nishikori	6	6
16	(Spain) G García López	4	4
12	(Germany) R Schüttler	6	6^{3}	6
(South Korea) H-t Lee	3	7^{7}	3
(Italy) F Cipolla	2	2
8	(Russia) M Youzhny	6	6

Third round
4	(France) R Gasquet	6	6
(Japan) K Nishikori	1	2
12	(Germany) R Schüttler	6	6^{12}	6
8	(Russia) M Youzhny	3	7^{14}	4

Quarterfinals
4	(France) R Gasquet	6	6
12	(Germany) R Schüttler	3	2

=== Bottom half ===
==== Section 3 ====
First round
(Australia) J Sirianni	6	6
Q	(Japan) Y Ito	3	2
(Croatia) R Karanušić	6	6
Q	(Japan) H Kondo	2	2
(Japan) G Soeda	4	2
(United States) A Delić	6	6
(Chinese Taipei) Y-h Lu	6	7^{7}
Q	(Slovenia) L Gregorc	4	6^{5}

Second round
6	(Spain) T Robredo	6	6
(Australia) J Sirianni	2	2
(Croatia) R Karanušić	3	4
9	(Czech Republic) T Berdych	6	6
13	(United States) S Querrey	6^{5}	3
(United States) A Delić	7^{7}	6
(Chinese Taipei) Y-h Lu	6	5	3
3	(Chile) F González	1	7	6

Third round
6	(Spain) T Robredo	6^{6}	2
9	(Czech Republic) T Berdych	7^{8}	6
(United States) A Delić	4	6^{4}
3	(Chile) F González	6	7^{7}

Quarterfinals
9	(Czech Republic) T Berdych	6	6
3	(Chile) F González	0	4

==== Section 4 ====
First round
(United States) B Reynolds	6	6
WC	(Japan) T Ito	3	1
(United States) W Odesnik	6	6
(United States) K Kim	4	3
(Germany) S Stadler	6	6
(Germany) P Petzschner	2	4
(Czech Republic) I Minář	7^{11}	2	6
(Germany) M Zverev	6^{9}	6	2

Second round
7	(France) J-W Tsonga	4	7^{7}	6
(United States) B Reynolds	6	6^{4}	4
(United States) W Odesnik	2	1
(Serbia) V Troicki	6	6
14	(Austria) J Melzer	6	6
(Germany) S Stadler	2	3
(Czech Republic) I Minář	6^{11}	7^{7}	6^{2}
2	(United States) A Roddick	7^{13}	6^{4}	7^{7}

Third round
7	(France) J-W Tsonga	7	1^{r}
(Serbia) V Troicki	5	2
14	(Austria) J Melzer	6^{2}	2
2	(United States) A Roddick	7^{7}	6

Quarterfinals
(Serbia) V Troicki	3	4
2	(United States) A Roddick	6	6
