= 2010 Rakuten Japan Open Tennis Championships – Singles =

Singles
- 2010 Rakuten Japan Open Tennis Championships

Final
- Champion: (Spain) Rafael Nadal
- Runner-up: (France) Gaël Monfils
- Score: 6–1, 7–5

Details
- Draw: 32 (4Q / 3WC)
- Seeds: 8

Events
| Singles | Doubles |
| ← 2009 · | Japan Open | · 2011 → |

Jo-Wilfried Tsonga was the defending champion, but was eliminated in the first round by Jarkko Nieminen.
Top seed Rafael Nadal defeated Gaël Monfils 6–1, 7–5 to become the event's third Spanish winner since David Ferrer won in 2007.

== Seeds ==
1. (Spain) Rafael Nadal (champion)
2. (United States) Andy Roddick (quarterfinals)
3. (France) Jo-Wilfried Tsonga (first round)
4. (Austria) Jürgen Melzer (second round)
5. (France) Gaël Monfils (final)
6. (Spain) Feliciano López (second round)
7. (Latvia) Ernests Gulbis (first round)
8. (France) Michaël Llodra (first round)

== Draw ==
=== Key ===
- Q = Qualifier
- WC = Wild card
- LL = Lucky loser
- Alt = Alternate
- SE = Special exempt
- PR = Protected ranking
- ITF = ITF entry
- JE = Junior exempt
- w/o = Walkover
- r = Retired
- d = Defaulted
- SR = Special ranking

=== Finals ===
Semifinals
1 | (Spain) Rafael Nadal | 7^{7} | 4 | 7^{9}
(Serbia) Viktor Troicki | 6^{4} | 6 | 6^{7}
(Czech Republic) Radek Štěpánek | 3 | 3
5 | (France) Gaël Monfils | 6 | 6

Final
1 | (Spain) Rafael Nadal | 6 | 7
5 | (France) Gaël Monfils | 1 | 5

=== Top half ===
First round
1 | (Spain) R Nadal | 6 | 6
(Colombia) S Giraldo | 4 | 4
(France) F Serra | 4 | 6 | 4
Q | (Canada) M Raonic | 6 | 3 | 6
(France) R Gasquet | 6 | 7^{8}
(Netherlands) T de Bakker | 3 | 6^{6}
(Russia) D Tursunov | 6 | 6
7 | (Latvia) E Gulbis | 3 | 4
4 | (Austria) J Melzer | 6 | 4 | 6
(Argentina) J Mónaco | 4 | 6 | 1
WC | (Japan) K Nishikori | 4 | 2
(Serbia) V Troicki | 6 | 6
(Spain) G García-López | 6^{3} | 6 | 7^{7}
Q | (United States) R Ram | 7^{7} | 4 | 6^{1}
(Argentina) JM del Potro | 3 | 0
6 | (Spain) F López | 6 | 6

Second round
1 | (Spain) R Nadal | 6 | 6
Q | (Canada) M Raonic | 4 | 4
(France) R Gasquet | 6^{2} | 6 | 4
(Russia) D Tursunov | 7^{7} | 1 | 6
4 | (Austria) J Melzer | 6^{7} | 6 | 6^{3}
(Serbia) V Troicki | 7^{9} | 3 | 7^{7}
(Spain) G García-López | 7^{7} | 6
6 | (Spain) F López | 6^{5} | 4

Quarterfinals
1 | (Spain) R Nadal | 6 | 6
(Russia) D Tursunov | 4 | 1
(Serbia) V Troicki | 6 | 3 | 6
(Spain) G García-López | 2 | 6 | 4

Semifinals
1 | (Spain) R Nadal | 7^{7} | 4 | 7^{9}
(Serbia) V Troicki | 6^{4} | 6 | 6^{7}

=== Bottom half ===
First round
8 | (France) M Llodra | 3 | 0
(Switzerland) M Chiudinelli | 6 | 6
(Colombia) A Falla | 6 | 6^{5} | 6^{5}
(Czech Republic) R Štěpánek | 2 | 7^{7} | 7^{7}
(Argentina) E Schwank | 4 | 4
(Spain) D Gimeno-Traver | 6 | 6
(Finland) J Nieminen | 6 | 5 | 6
3 | (France) J-W Tsonga | 4 | 7 | 1
5 | (France) G Monfils | 7^{12} | 6
WC | (Japan) G Soeda | 6^{10} | 4
Q | (Croatia) I Dodig | 6 | 4 | 2
(Italy) A Seppi | 3 | 6 | 6
Q | (France) É Roger-Vasselin | 3 | 6^{2}
(France) J Chardy | 6 | 7^{7}
WC | (Japan) T Ito | 4 | 3
2 | (United States) A Roddick | 6 | 6

Second round
(Switzerland) M Chiudinelli | 7 | 6^{7} | 1^{r}
(Czech Republic) R Štěpánek | 5 | 7^{9} | 4
(Spain) D Gimeno-Traver | 3 | 6^{8}
(Finland) J Nieminen | 6 | 7^{10}
5 | (France) G Monfils | 6 | 6
(Italy) A Seppi | 4 | 4
(France) J Chardy | 4 | 6^{4}
2 | (United States) A Roddick | 6 | 7^{7}

Quarterfinals
(Czech Republic) R Štěpánek | w/o
(Finland) J Nieminen
5 | (France) G Monfils | 7^{7} | 4 | 7^{8}
2 | (United States) A Roddick | 6^{5} | 6 | 6^{6}

Semifinals
(Czech Republic) R Štěpánek | 3 | 3
5 | (France) G Monfils | 6 | 6

== Qualifying ==
=== Seeds ===
1. (Brazil) Ricardo Mello (first round)
2. (Turkey) Marsel İlhan (qualifying competition)
3. (France) Édouard Roger-Vasselin (qualified)
4. (Germany) Mischa Zverev (first round)
5. (Croatia) Ivan Dodig (qualified)
6. (Brazil) Thiago Alves (first round)
7. (Luxembourg) Gilles Müller (first round)
8. (United States) Rajeev Ram (qualified)

=== Qualifiers ===
1. (United States) Rajeev Ram
2. (Canada) Milos Raonic
3. (France) Édouard Roger-Vasselin
4. (Croatia) Ivan Dodig

=== Draw ===
==== First qualifier ====
First round
1 | (Brazil) Ricardo Mello | 3 | 6 | 6^{6}
WC | (Japan) Hiroki Moriya | 6 | 1 | 7^{8}
(Canada) Peter Polansky | 1 | 2^{r}
8 | (United States) Rajeev Ram | 6 | 2

Qualifying competition
WC | (Japan) Hiroki Moriya | 6 | 4 | 3
8 | (United States) Rajeev Ram | 4 | 6 | 6

==== Second qualifier ====
First round
2 | (Turkey) Marsel İlhan | 7^{7} | 7^{7}
WC | (Japan) Hiroki Kondo | 6^{5} | 6^{5}
(Canada) Milos Raonic | 6 | 7^{7}
6 | (Brazil) Thiago Alves | 3 | 6^{2}

Qualifying competition
2 | (Turkey) Marsel İlhan | 6^{5} | 3
(Canada) Milos Raonic | 7^{7} | 6

==== Third qualifier ====
First round
3 | (France) Édouard Roger-Vasselin | 6 | 6
(Japan) Yūichi Sugita | 4 | 1
(Japan) Takao Suzuki | 7^{7} | 7^{7}
7 | (Luxembourg) Gilles Müller | 6^{5} | 6^{5}

Qualifying competition
3 | (France) Édouard Roger-Vasselin | 7^{7} | 6
(Japan) Takao Suzuki | 6^{3} | 3

==== Fourth qualifier ====
First round
4 | (Germany) Mischa Zverev | 6^{7} | 7^{7} | 6^{4}
(Spain) Iván Navarro | 7^{9} | 6^{3} | 7^{7}
WC | (Japan) Toshihide Matsui | 3 | 6 | 6^{0}
5 | (Croatia) Ivan Dodig | 6 | 4 | 7^{7}

Qualifying competition
4 | (Spain) Iván Navarro | 4 | 2
5 | (Croatia) Ivan Dodig | 6 | 6
