= 2006 AIG Japan Open Tennis Championships =

- Date: 2–8 October
- Edition: 33rd
- Surface: Hard / outdoor
- Location: Tokyo, Japan
- Venue: Ariake Coliseum

Champions

Men's singles
- (Switzerland) Roger Federer

Women's singles
- (France) Marion Bartoli

Men's doubles
- (Australia) Ashley Fisher / (United States) Tripp Phillips

Women's doubles
- (United States) Vania King / (Croatia) Jelena Kostanić
← 2005 ·	Japan Open	· 2007 →

The 2006 AIG Japan Open Tennis Championships was a tennis tournament played on outdoor hard courts. It was the 33rd edition of the event known that year as the AIG Japan Open Tennis Championships, and was part of the International Series Gold of the 2006 ATP Tour, and of the Tier III Series of the 2006 WTA Tour. Both the men's and the women's events took place at the Ariake Coliseum in Tokyo, Japan, from 2 October through 8 October 2006. Roger Federer and Marion Bartoli won the singles titles.

== Finals ==
=== Men's singles ===
(Switzerland) Roger Federer defeated (United Kingdom) Tim Henman, 6–3, 6–3

=== Women's singles ===
(France) Marion Bartoli defeated (Japan) Aiko Nakamura, 2–6, 6–2, 6–2

=== Men's doubles ===
(Australia) Ashley Fisher / (United States) Tripp Phillips defeated (United States) Paul Goldstein / (United States) Jim Thomas, 6–2, 7–5

=== Women's doubles ===
(United States) Vania King / (Croatia) Jelena Kostanić defeated (Chinese Taipei) Chan Yung-jan / (Chinese Taipei) Chuang Chia-jung, 7–6^{(7–2)}, 5–7, 6–2
