= 2005 AIG Japan Open Tennis Championships – Men's singles =

Men's singles
- 2005 AIG Japan Open Tennis Championships

Final
- Champion: (South Africa) Wesley Moodie
- Runner-up: (Croatia) Mario Ančić
- Score: 1–6, 7–6^{(9–7)}, 6–4

Details
- Draw: 48 (6 Q / 4 WC )
- Seeds: 16

Events
Singles	men	women
Doubles	men	women
← 2004 ·	Japan Open	· 2006 →

Jiří Novák was the defending champion, but did not participate.

Wesley Moodie won the title, defeating Mario Ančić in the final 1–6, 7–6^{(9–7)}, 6–4.

== Seeds ==
All seeds receive a bye into the second round.

1. (Argentina) Mariano Puerta (third round)
2. (Czech Republic) Radek Štěpánek (quarterfinals)
3. (United States) Robby Ginepri (quarterfinals)
4. (United States) Taylor Dent (quarterfinals)
5. (Croatia) Mario Ančić (final)
6. (Russia) Mikhail Youzhny (second round)
7. (Finland) Jarkko Nieminen (semifinals)
8. (United States) Vince Spadea (second round)
9. (Thailand) Paradorn Srichaphan (third round)
10. (Denmark) Kenneth Carlsen (third round)
11. (Peru) Luis Horna (third round)
12. (France) Cyril Saulnier (third round)
13. (Luxembourg) Gilles Müller (third round)
14. (Czech Republic) Ivo Minář (second round)
15. (Czech Republic) Robin Vik (second round)
16. (Argentina) Juan Mónaco (second round)

== Draw ==
=== Key ===
- Q = Qualifier
- WC = Wild card
- LL = Lucky loser
- Alt = Alternate
- ITF = ITF entry
- PR = Protected ranking
- SR = Special ranking
- SE = Special exempt
- JE = Junior exempt
- JR = Junior Accelerator Programme entrant
- CO = College Accelerator Programme entrant
- NG = Next Gen Accelerator Program entrant
- w/o = Walkover
- r = Retired
- d = Defaulted

=== Finals ===
Quarterfinals
(Cyprus) Marcos Baghdatis	1	6^{4}
5	(Croatia) Mario Ančić	6	7^{7}
3	(United States) Robby Ginepri	4	3
(Germany) Björn Phau	6	6
7	(Finland) Jarkko Nieminen	6	5	7^{7}
4	(United States) Taylor Dent	4	7	6^{3}
(South Africa) Wesley Moodie	7^{7}	7^{8}
2	(Czech Republic) Radek Štěpánek	6^{2}	6^{6}

Semifinals
5	(Croatia) Mario Ančić	6	6
(Germany) Björn Phau	2	1
7	(Finland) Jarkko Nieminen	6	1	6^{4}
(South Africa) Wesley Moodie	4	6	7^{7}

Final
5	(Croatia) Mario Ančić	6	6^{7}	4
(South Africa) Wesley Moodie	1	7^{9}	6

=== Top half ===
==== Section 1 ====
First round
Q	(Japan) T Iwami	6^{9}	4
Q	(United States) E Taino	7^{11}	6
(Cyprus) M Baghdatis	6	6
(Serbia and Montenegro) J Tipsarević	4	4
Q	(Netherlands) R Sluiter	6	6
(Germany) L Burgsmüller	3	1
Q	(United States) J-M Gambill	6	5	6
(Netherlands) P Wessels	2	7	3

Second round
1	(Argentina) M Puerta	6	6
Q	(United States) E Taino	3	4
(Cyprus) M Baghdatis	6	6
14	(Czech Republic) I Minář	4	2
12	(France) C Saulnier	6	6^{5}	7
Q	(Netherlands) R Sluiter	3	7^{7}	5
Q	(United States) J-M Gambill	6	3	4
5	(Croatia) M Ančić	3	6	6

Third round
1	(Argentina) M Puerta	2	7^{13}	5
(Cyprus) M Baghdatis	6	6^{11}	7
12	(France) C Saulnier	2	1
5	(Croatia) M Ančić	6	6

Quarterfinals
(Cyprus) M Baghdatis	1	6^{4}
5	(Croatia) M Ančić	6	7^{7}

==== Section 2 ====
First round
WC	(Japan) G Motomura	2	4
PR	(Germany) A Popp	6	6
(Germany) A Waske	3	7^{7}	7^{7}
(United States) J Gimelstob	6	6^{5}	6^{3}
WC	(Japan) T Ittogi	0	1
(Ecuador) N Lapentti	6	6
(Austria) S Koubek	7^{9}	4	6^{5}
(Germany) B Phau	6^{7}	6	7^{7}

Second round
3	(United States) R Ginepri	6	6
PR	(Germany) A Popp	4	0
(Germany) A Waske	5	6	1
13	(Luxembourg) G Müller	7	4	6
10	(Denmark) K Carlsen	7^{7}	7^{11}
(Ecuador) N Lapentti	6^{1}	6^{9}
(Germany) B Phau	6	7
8	(United States) V Spadea	4	5

Third round
3	(United States) R Ginepri	6	6
13	(Luxembourg) G Müller	4	4
10	(Denmark) K Carlsen	1	2
(Germany) B Phau	6	6

Quarterfinals
3	(United States) R Ginepri	4	3
(Germany) B Phau	6	6

=== Bottom half ===
==== Section 3 ====
First round
Q	(Japan) G Soeda	4	6	2
(Germany) R Schüttler	6	4	6
(Germany) P Kohlschreiber	3	6^{1}
WC	(Japan) T Terachi	6	7^{7}
(Australia) W Arthurs	6	1	7^{7}
WC	(Japan) T Suzuki	3	6	6^{2}
PR	(Russia) D Tursunov	3	6	6
(Spain) G García López	6	4	1

Second round
7	(Finland) J Nieminen	6	6
(Germany) R Schüttler	1	1
WC	(Japan) T Terachi	1	4
9	(Thailand) P Srichaphan	6	6
16	(Argentina) J Mónaco	6	1	4
(Australia) W Arthurs	4	6	6
PR	(Russia) D Tursunov	3	6^{3}
4	(United States) T Dent	6	7^{7}

Third round
7	(Finland) J Nieminen	2	7^{8}	7
9	(Thailand) P Srichaphan	6	6^{6}	5
(Australia) W Arthurs	4	7^{7}	3
4	(United States) T Dent	6	6^{5}	6

Quarterfinals
7	(Finland) J Nieminen	6	5	7^{7}
4	(United States) T Dent	4	7	6^{3}

==== Section 4 ====
First round
(South Africa) W Moodie	6	6
(Chinese Taipei) J Wang	1	4
(Thailand) D Udomchoke	6^{5}	4
(Croatia) R Karanušić	7^{7}	6
Q	(Germany) D Gremelmayr	2	6^{3}
(United States) K Kim	6	7^{7}
(Czech Republic) J Vaněk	7^{7}	7^{7}
(Czech Republic) L Dlouhý	6^{4}	6^{5}

Second round
6	(Russia) M Youzhny	1	6	3
(South Africa) W Moodie	6	3	6
(Croatia) R Karanušić	2	5
11	(Peru) L Horna	6	7
15	(Czech Republic) R Vik	2	4
(United States) K Kim	6	6
(Czech Republic) J Vaněk	5	4
2	(Czech Republic) R Štěpánek	7	6

Third round
(South Africa) W Moodie	7^{7}	6^{2}	6
11	(Peru) L Horna	6^{4}	7^{7}	4
(United States) K Kim	1	3
2	(Czech Republic) R Štěpánek	6	6

Quarterfinals
(South Africa) W Moodie	7^{7}	7^{8}
2	(Czech Republic) R Štěpánek	6^{2}	6^{6}
