= 2009 Keio Challenger =

Tennis tournament

- Date: 16–22 November
- Edition: 7th
- Location: Yokohama, Japan

Champions

Singles
- (Japan) Takao Suzuki

Doubles
- (Chinese Taipei) Yang Tsung-hua / (Chinese Taipei) Yi Chu-huan
- Keio Challenger

The 2009 Keio Challenger was a professional tennis tournament played on outdoor hard courts. It was the seventh edition of the tournament which was part of the 2009 ATP Challenger Tour. It took place in Yokohama, Japan between 16 and 22 November 2009.

== ATP entrants ==
=== Seeds ===
Country	Player	Rank^{1}	Seed
JPN	Go Soeda	152	1
KOR	Im Kyu-tae	160	2
GER	Dieter Kindlmann	184	3
JPN	Tatsuma Ito	234	4
AUT	Philipp Oswald	235	5
SVK	Pavol Červenák	242	6
AUS	Nick Lindahl	260	7
AUT	Martin Fischer	267	8

- Rankings are as of November 9, 2009.

=== Other entrants ===
The following players received wildcards into the singles main draw:

- (Japan) Sho Aida
- (Japan) Toshihide Matsui
- (Japan) Koki Matsunaga
- (Japan) Junn Mitsuhashi

The following players received entry from the qualifying draw:

- (Chinese Taipei) Chen Ti
- (Japan) Yuichi Ito
- (Russia) Alexander Kudryavtsev
- (Chinese Taipei) Yi Chu-huan

== Champions ==
=== Singles ===
(Japan) Takao Suzuki def. (Austria) Martin Fischer, 6–4, 7–6(5)

=== Doubles ===
(Chinese Taipei) Yang Tsung-hua / (Chinese Taipei) Yi Chu-huan def. (Kazakhstan) Alexey Kedryuk / (Japan) Junn Mitsuhashi, 6–7(9), 6–3, [12–10]
