= 2009 Keio Challenger – Doubles =

Doubles
- 2009 Keio Challenger

Final
- Champions: (Chinese Taipei) Yang Tsung-hua; (Chinese Taipei) Yi Chu-huan
- Runners-up: (Kazakhstan) Alexey Kedryuk; (Japan) Junn Mitsuhashi
- Score: 6–7(9), 6–3, [12–10]

Events
Singles	Doubles
← 2008 ·	Keio Challenger	· 2010 →

Tomáš Cakl and Marek Semjan chose to not defend their 2008 title.
Yang Tsung-hua and Yi Chu-huan defeated Alexey Kedryuk and Junn Mitsuhashi 6–7(9), 6–3, [12–10] in the final.

== Seeds ==
1. (Austria) Martin Fischer / (Austria) Philipp Oswald (first round)
2. (Latvia) Andis Juška / (Russia) Alexander Kudryavtsev (first round)
3. (Kazakhstan) Alexey Kedryuk / (Japan) Junn Mitsuhashi (final)
4. (Australia) Sadik Kadir / (Switzerland) Alexander Sadecky (semifinals)

== Draw ==
=== Key ===
- Q = Qualifier
- WC = Wild card
- LL = Lucky loser
- Alt = Alternate
- SE = Special exempt
- PR = Protected ranking
- ITF = ITF entry
- JE = Junior exempt
- w/o = Walkover
- r = Retired
- d = Defaulted
- SR = Special ranking

=== Finals ===
Semifinals

Final

- (Chinese Taipei) T-h Yang
- (Chinese Taipei) C-h Yi
7
6

4
- (Australia) S Kadir
- (Switzerland) A Sadecky
6^{4}
4

- (Chinese Taipei) T-h Yang
- (Chinese Taipei) C-h Yi
6^{9}
6
[12]

3
- (Kazakhstan) A Kedryuk
- (Japan) J Mitsuhashi
7
3
[10]

3
- (Kazakhstan) A Kedryuk
- (Japan) J Mitsuhashi
7
6

- (Japan) Y Sugita
- (Japan) T Suzuki
5
3
