= 2006 AIG Japan Open Tennis Championships – Men's doubles =

Men's doubles
- 2006 AIG Japan Open Tennis Championships

Final
- Champions: (Australia) Ashley Fisher (United States) Tripp Phillips
- Runners-up: (United States) Paul Goldstein (United States) Jim Thomas
- Score: 6–2, 7–5

Details
- Draw: 16 (2WC)
- Seeds: 4

Events
Singles	men	women
Doubles	men	women
- Japan Open

Satoshi Iwabuchi and Takao Suzuki were the defending champions, but lost in quarterfinals to Kevin Kim and Lee Hyung-taik.

Ashley Fisher and Tripp Phillips won the title by defeating Paul Goldstein and Jim Thomas 6–2, 7–5 in the final.

== Seeds ==
1. (Sweden) Simon Aspelin / (Australia) Todd Perry (first round)
2. (Germany) Michael Kohlmann / (Germany) Alexander Waske (first round)
3. (Australia) Ashley Fisher / (United States) Tripp Phillips (champions)
4. (South Africa) Chris Haggard / (South Africa) Wesley Moodie (first round)

== Draw ==
Key

- Q = Qualifier
- WC = Wild card
- LL = Lucky loser
- Alt = Alternate
- ITF = ITF entry
- PR = Protected ranking
- SR = Special ranking
- SE = Special exempt
- JE = Junior exempt
- JR = Junior Accelerator Programme entrant
- CO = College Accelerator Programme entrant
- NG = Next Gen Accelerator Program entrant
- w/o = Walkover
- r = Retired
- d = Defaulted

=== Draw ===
First round
1	(Sweden) S Aspelin (Australia) T Perry	4	3
(South Africa) J Coetzee (Netherlands) R Wassen	6	6
(Spain) T Robredo (Spain) F Vicente	4	6^{2}
(Czech Republic) J Novák (Czech Republic) P Pála	6	7^{7}
3	(Australia) A Fisher (United States) T Phillips	6	6
WC	(Japan) G Motomura (Japan) G Soeda	4	2
(Germany) B Becker (Germany) L Burgsmüller	6	6
(Germany) S Greul (Germany) R Schüttler	2	4
WC	(Japan) S Iwabuchi (Japan) T Suzuki	7^{14}	7^{7}
(Australia) W Arthurs (Australia) S Huss	6^{12}	6^{4}
(United States) K Kim (South Korea) H-t Lee	6	7
4	(South Africa) C Haggard (South Africa) W Moodie	4	5
(United Kingdom) A Murray (United Kingdom) J Murray	7	6
(United States) E Butorac (United States) T Parrott	5	3
(United States) P Goldstein (United States) J Thomas	6	7^{7}
2	(Germany) M Kohlmann (Germany) A Waske	3	6^{4}

Quarterfinals
(South Africa) J Coetzee (Netherlands) R Wassen	4	7^{7}	[6]
(Czech Republic) J Novák (Czech Republic) P Pála	6	6^{2}	[10]
3	(Australia) A Fisher (United States) T Phillips	7	3	[11]
(Germany) B Becker (Germany) L Burgsmüller	5	6	[9]
WC	(Japan) S Iwabuchi (Japan) T Suzuki	6^{0}	3
(United States) K Kim (South Korea) H-t Lee	7^{7}	6
(United Kingdom) A Murray (United Kingdom) J Murray	6^{4}	1
(United States) P Goldstein (United States) J Thomas	7^{7}	6

Semifinals
(Czech Republic) J Novák (Czech Republic) P Pála	6	3	[2]
3	(Australia) A Fisher (United States) T Phillips	4	6	[10]
(United States) K Kim (South Korea) H-t Lee	1	6^{1}
(United States) P Goldstein (United States) J Thomas	6	7^{7}

Final
3	(Australia) A Fisher (United States) T Phillips	6	7
(United States) P Goldstein (United States) J Thomas	2	5
