= 2009 Rakuten Japan Open Tennis Championships – Doubles =

Doubles
- 2009 Rakuten Japan Open Tennis Championships

Final
- Champions: (Austria) Julian Knowle (Austria) Jürgen Melzer
- Runners-up: (United Kingdom) Ross Hutchins (Australia) Jordan Kerr
- Score: 6–2, 5–7, [10–8]

Details
- Draw: 16 (2WC)
- Seeds: 4

Events
Singles	Doubles
- Japan Open

Mikhail Youzhny and Mischa Zverev were the defending champions, but they chose not to participate this year.
Julian Knowle and Jürgen Melzer won in the final 6–2, 5–7, [10–8] against Ross Hutchins and Jordan Kerr.

== Seeds ==
1. (Czech Republic) František Čermák / (Slovakia) Michal Mertiňák (quarterfinals)
2. (Czech Republic) Martin Damm / (Sweden) Robert Lindstedt (first round)
3. (Sweden) Simon Aspelin / (Australia) Paul Hanley (first round)
4. (United States) Travis Parrott / (Slovakia) Filip Polášek (first round)

== Draw ==
Key

- Q = Qualifier
- WC = Wild card
- LL = Lucky loser
- Alt = Alternate
- ITF = ITF entry
- PR = Protected ranking
- SR = Special ranking
- SE = Special exempt
- JE = Junior exempt
- JR = Junior Accelerator Programme entrant
- CO = College Accelerator Programme entrant
- NG = Next Gen Accelerator Program entrant
- w/o = Walkover
- r = Retired
- d = Defaulted

First round
1	(Czech Republic) F Čermák (Slovakia) M Mertiňák	6	6
(Germany) A Beck (Germany) P Petzschner	2	3
(Germany) C Kas (Czech Republic) J Levinský	6	6
ALT	(Switzerland) M Chiudinelli (Germany) D Meffert	3	2
4	(United States) T Parrott (Slovakia) F Polášek	2	7	[7]
WC	(Japan) H Kondo (Japan) G Soeda	6	5	[10]
(United Kingdom) R Hutchins (Australia) J Kerr	7	4	[10]
(Argentina) J Mónaco (Czech Republic) R Štěpánek	5	6	[7]
(Sweden) J Brunström (Netherlands Antilles) J-J Rojer	6	3	[11]
(Australia) S Huss (United States) S Lipsky	3	6	9
(Austria) J Knowle (Austria) J Melzer	4	7^{7}	[14]
3	(Sweden) S Aspelin (Australia) P Hanley	6	6^{5}	[12]
(South Africa) J Coetzee (South Africa) R de Voest	2	4
(France) J-W Tsonga (Switzerland) S Wawrinka	6	6
WC	(Japan) S Iwabuchi (Japan) T Suzuki	6	3	[10]
2	(Czech Republic) M Damm (Sweden) R Lindstedt	1	6	[6]

Quarterfinals
1	(Czech Republic) F Čermák (Slovakia) M Mertiňák	7^{7}	4	[10]
(Germany) C Kas (Czech Republic) J Levinský	6^{0}	6	[12]
WC	(Japan) H Kondo (Japan) G Soeda	2	3
(United Kingdom) R Hutchins (Australia) J Kerr	6	6
(Sweden) J Brunström (Netherlands Antilles) J-J Rojer	6	4	[9]
(Austria) J Knowle (Austria) J Melzer	3	6	[11]
(France) J-W Tsonga (Switzerland) S Wawrinka	3	6	[8]
WC	(Japan) S Iwabuchi (Japan) T Suzuki	6	4	[10]

Semifinals
(Germany) C Kas (Czech Republic) J Levinský	3	6	[7]
(United Kingdom) R Hutchins (Australia) J Kerr	6	3	[10]
(Austria) J Knowle (Austria) J Melzer	6	4	[10]
WC	(Japan) S Iwabuchi (Japan) T Suzuki	2	6	[4]

Final
(United Kingdom) R Hutchins (Australia) J Kerr	2	7	[8]
(Austria) J Knowle (Austria) J Melzer	6	5	[10]
