= 2009 Shimadzu All Japan Indoor Tennis Championships =

- Date: March 9 – March 15
- Edition: 13th
- Location: Kyoto, Japan

Champions

Singles
- (Ukraine) Sergei Bubka

Doubles
- (Pakistan) Aisam-ul-Haq Qureshi / (Austria) Martin Slanar
- Shimadzu All Japan Indoor Tennis Championships

The 2009 Shimadzu All Japan Indoor Tennis Championships was a professional tennis tournament played on indoor carpet courts. The tournament was part of the 2009 ATP Challenger Tour. It took place in Kyoto, Japan between 9 and 15 March 2009.

Go Soeda (in singles) and Dieter Kindlmann / Martin Slanar (in doubles) were the defending champions. Soeda lost to Baptiste Dupuy in the first round of singles' competition. Kindlmann chose to not participate this year and Slanar partnered up with Aisam-ul-Haq Qureshi and they won in the final.

== Singles main-draw entrants ==
=== Seeds ===
Nationality	Player	Ranking*	Seeding
JPN	Go Soeda	106	1
KOR	Lee Hyung-taik	113	2
AUS	Chris Guccione	127	3
IND	Prakash Amritraj	193	4
GER	Dieter Kindlmann	210	5
GER	Matthias Bachinger	220	6
AUS	Colin Ebelthite	229	7
AUT	Martin Slanar	245	8

- Rankings are as of March 2, 2009.

=== Other entrants ===
The following players received wildcards into the singles main draw:

- (Lithuania) Ričardas Berankis
- (Japan) Hiroki Moriya
- (Japan) Gouichi Motomura
- (Japan) Takao Suzuki

The following players received entry from the qualifying draw:

- (France) Baptiste Dupuy
- (United States) Eric Nunez
- (United States) Tim Smyczek
- (United States) Toshihide Matsui

== Champions ==
=== Men's singles ===
(Ukraine) Sergei Bubka def. (Japan) Takao Suzuki, 7–6(6), 6–4

=== Men's doubles ===
(Pakistan) Aisam-ul-Haq Qureshi / (Austria) Martin Slanar def. (Germany) Michael Kohlmann / (Germany) Philipp Marx, 6–7(7), 7–6(3), [10–6]
