= 2009 Shimadzu All Japan Indoor Tennis Championships – Doubles =

Doubles
- 2009 Shimadzu All Japan Indoor Tennis Championships

Final
- Champions: (Pakistan) Aisam-ul-Haq Qureshi (Austria) Martin Slanar
- Runners-up: (Japan) Tatsuma Ito (Japan) Takao Suzuki
- Score: 6–7^{(7–9)}, 7–6^{(7–3)}, [10–6]

Events
Singles	Doubles
- Shimadzu All Japan Indoor Tennis Championships

Dieter Kindlmann and Martin Slanar were the defending champions, Kindlmann chose not to participate. Slanar partnered Aisam-ul-Haq Qureshi and successfully defended his title defeating Tatsuma Ito and Takao Suzuki in the final, 6–7^{(7–9)}, 7–6^{(7–3)}, [10–6].

== Seeds ==
1. (Pakistan) Aisam-ul-Haq Qureshi / (Austria) Martin Slanar (champions)
2. (India) Prakash Amritraj / (India) Stephen Amritraj (quarterfinals)
3. (United States) Alex Kuznetsov / (United States) Tim Smyczek (first round)
4. (Germany) Matthias Bachinger / (Germany) Sebastian Rieschick (first round)

== Draw ==
Key

- Q = Qualifier
- WC = Wild card
- LL = Lucky loser
- Alt = Alternate
- ITF = ITF entry
- PR = Protected ranking
- SR = Special ranking
- SE = Special exempt
- JE = Junior exempt
- JR = Junior Accelerator Programme entrant
- CO = College Accelerator Programme entrant
- NG = Next Gen Accelerator Program entrant
- w/o = Walkover
- r = Retired
- d = Defaulted

First round
1	(Pakistan) A-u-H Qureshi (Austria) M Slanar	7^{7}	6
(Spain) G Alcaide (United Kingdom) A Slabinsky	6^{3}	3
(Japan) T Iwami (Japan) G Motomura	7	6
Q	(Japan) Akito Higa (Japan) Hiroyasu Sato	5	3
4	(Germany) M Bachinger (Germany) S Rieschick	1	3
(Australia) C Ebelthite (Australia) S Kadir	6	6
(Japan) Junn Mitsuhashi (United States) E Nunez	6	6^{4}	[7]
WC	(Japan) Sho Aida (Japan) Koki Matsunaga	1	7^{7}	[10]
WC	(Japan) T Ito (Japan) T Suzuki	7	6
(Croatia) I Dodig (Japan) Y Sugita	5	3
(South Africa) R Klaasen (South Africa) I van der Merwe	6	6
3	(United States) A Kuznetsov (United States) T Smyczek	4	4
WC	(Japan) Bumpei Sato (Japan) K Takeuchi	2	7^{7}	[11]
(Ukraine) S Bubka (Slovakia) I Klec	6	6^{4}	[9]
(Japan) H Kondo (Japan) T Matsui	7	5	[5]
2	(India) P Amritraj (India) S Amritraj	5	7	[10]

Quarterfinals
1	(Pakistan) A-u-H Qureshi (Austria) M Slanar	6	6
(Japan) T Iwami (Japan) G Motomura	4	1
(Australia) C Ebelthite (Australia) S Kadir	3	2
WC	(Japan) S Aida (Japan) K Matsunaga	6	6
WC	(Japan) T Ito (Japan) T Suzuki	6	6
(South Africa) R Klaasen (South Africa) I van der Merwe	4	4
WC	(Japan) B Sato (Japan) K Takeuchi	4	6	[10]
2	(India) P Amritraj (India) S Amritraj	6	1	[6]

Semifinals
1	(Pakistan) A-u-H Qureshi (Austria) M Slanar	6	6
(Japan) S Aida (Japan) K Matsunaga	4	4
WC	(Japan) T Ito (Japan) T Suzuki	6	6
(Japan) B Sato (Japan) K Takeuchi	2	0

Final
1	(Pakistan) A-u-H Qureshi (Austria) M Slanar	6^{7}	7^{7}	[10]
WC	(Japan) T Ito (Japan) T Suzuki	7^{9}	6^{3}	[6]
