= 2006 AIG Japan Open Tennis Championships – Men's singles =

Men's singles
- 2006 AIG Japan Open Tennis Championships

Final
- Champion: (Switzerland) Roger Federer
- Runner-up: (United Kingdom) Tim Henman
- Score: 6–3, 6–3

Details
- Draw: 48 (6 Q / 4 WC )
- Seeds: 16

Events
Singles	men	women
Doubles	men	women
← 2005 ·	Japan Open	· 2007 →

Wesley Moodie was the defending champion, but lost in the third round to Roger Federer.

First-seeded Roger Federer won in the final 6–3, 6–3, against Tim Henman.

== Seeds ==
All seeds receive a bye into the second round.

1. (Switzerland) Roger Federer (champion)
2. (Spain) Tommy Robredo (quarterfinals)
3. (Croatia) Mario Ančić (quarterfinals)
4. (United Kingdom) Andy Murray (second round)
5. (Finland) Jarkko Nieminen (quarterfinals)
6. (Russia) Dmitry Tursunov (third round)
7. (United States) Robby Ginepri (second round)
8. (Thailand) Paradorn Srichaphan (second round)
9. (South Korea) Hyung-taik Lee (semifinals)
10. (United Kingdom) Tim Henman (final)
11. (Germany) Björn Phau (second round)
12. (Argentina) Juan Mónaco (third round)
13. (South Africa) Wesley Moodie (third round)
14. (Germany) Benjamin Becker (semifinals)
15. (United States) Vince Spadea (third round)
16. (United States) Paul Goldstein (second round)

== Draw ==
=== Key ===
- Q = Qualifier
- WC = Wild card
- LL = Lucky loser
- Alt = Alternate
- SE = Special exempt
- PR = Protected ranking
- ITF = ITF entry
- JE = Junior exempt
- w/o = Walkover
- r = Retired
- d = Defaulted
- SR = Special ranking

=== Finals ===
Quarterfinals
1	(Switzerland) Roger Federer	4	7	7^{7}
WC	(Japan) Takao Suzuki	6	5	6^{3}
14	(Germany) Benjamin Becker	6^{5}	7^{8}	6
5	(Finland) Jarkko Nieminen	7^{7}	6^{6}	4
10	(United Kingdom) Tim Henman	6	6
3	(Croatia) Mario Ančić	2	2
9	(South Korea) Hyung-taik Lee	7^{7}	4	6
2	(Spain) Tommy Robredo	6^{3}	6	1

Semifinals
1	(Switzerland) Roger Federer	6	6
14	(Germany) Benjamin Becker	3	4
10	(United Kingdom) Tim Henman	6	7^{7}
9	(South Korea) Hyung-taik Lee	4	6^{5}

Final
1	(Switzerland) Roger Federer	6	6
10	(United Kingdom) Tim Henman	3	3

=== Top half ===
==== Section 1 ====
First round
(Spain) F Vicente	7^{7}	4	2
Q	(Serbia) V Troicki	6^{4}	6	6
(Italy) S Galvani	3	6	5
(Austria) S Koubek	6	4	7
(Germany) A Waske	6	6
Q	(Japan) T Chaen	4	4
(Germany) S Greul	2	2
WC	(Japan) T Suzuki	6	6

Second round
1	(Switzerland) R Federer	7^{7}	7^{7}
Q	(Serbia) V Troicki	6^{2}	6^{3}
(Austria) S Koubek	3	4
13	(South Africa) W Moodie	6	6
11	(Germany) B Phau	4	4
(Germany) A Waske	6	6
WC	(Japan) T Suzuki	7^{7}	6^{5}	6
8	(Thailand) P Srichaphan	6^{4}	7^{7}	4

Third round
1	(Switzerland) R Federer	6	6
13	(South Africa) W Moodie	2	1
(Germany) A Waske	7^{7}	6^{10}	1
WC	(Japan) T Suzuki	6^{4}	7^{12}	6

Quarterfinals
1	(Switzerland) R Federer	4	7	7^{7}
WC	(Japan) T Suzuki	6	5	6^{3}

==== Section 2 ====
First round
(Czech Republic) R Vik	6	4	4
(Czech Republic) J Novák	4	6	6
(Thailand) D Udomchoke	7^{7}	6
Q	(Croatia) M Čilić	6^{3}	3
(Argentina) E Massa	6	6
(Greece) K Economidis	1	3
LL	(Germany) L Burgsmüller	6^{5}	7^{9}	7^{7}
Q	(Australia) W Arthurs	7^{7}	6^{7}	6^{3}

Second round
4	(United Kingdom) A Murray	3	6^{1}
(Czech Republic) J Novák	6	7^{7}
(Thailand) D Udomchoke	2	1
14	(Germany) B Becker	6	6
12	(Argentina) J Mónaco	7^{7}	6
(Argentina) E Massa	6^{4}	3
LL	(Germany) L Burgsmüller	5	6^{2}
5	(Finland) J Nieminen	7	7^{7}

Third round
(Czech Republic) J Novák	6	3	6^{4}
14	(Germany) B Becker	3	6	7^{7}
12	(Argentina) J Mónaco	2	3
5	(Finland) J Nieminen	6	6

Quarterfinals
14	(Germany) B Becker	6^{5}	7^{8}	6
5	(Finland) J Nieminen	7^{7}	6^{6}	4

=== Bottom half ===
==== Section 3 ====
First round
WC	(Japan) G Soeda	3	1
(Argentina) JM del Potro	6	6
(Canada) F Dancevic	6	6
(Brazil) M Daniel	4	4
(Germany) R Schüttler	6	6
(Germany) M Berrer	2	1
WC	(Japan) G Motomura	7^{7}	3	2
(Denmark) K Carlsen	6^{5}	6	6

Second round
7	(United States) R Ginepri	2	2
(Argentina) JM del Potro	6	6
(Canada) F Dancevic	2	1
10	(United Kingdom) T Henman	6	6
16	(United States) P Goldstein	3	2
(Germany) R Schüttler	6	6
(Denmark) K Carlsen	1	4
3	(Croatia) M Ančić	6	6

Third round
(Argentina) JM del Potro	6^{3}	3
10	(United Kingdom) T Henman	7^{7}	6
(Germany) R Schüttler	2	6	4
3	(Croatia) M Ančić	6	4	6

Quarterfinals
10	(United Kingdom) T Henman	6	6
3	(Croatia) M Ančić	2	2

==== Section 4 ====
First round
(Taiwan) J Wang	6	6
(United States) K Kim	3	1
(South Africa) R de Voest	3	4
(Denmark) K Pless	6	6
Q	(Taiwan) T Chen	2	1
WC	(Japan) S Iwabuchi	6	6
Q	(Taiwan) Y-h Lu	6	6
(Paraguay) R Delgado	2	3

Second round
6	(Russia) D Tursunov	6	5	7
(Taiwan) J Wang	3	7	5
(Denmark) K Pless	5	1
9	(South Korea) Lee H-T	7	6
16	(United States) V Spadea	2	6	6
WC	(Japan) S Iwabuchi	6	2	0
Q	(Taiwan) Y-h Lu	4	1
2	(Spain) T Robredo	6	6

Third round
6	(Russia) D Tursunov	4	6	4
9	(South Korea) Lee H-T	6	2	6
16	(United States) V Spadea	4	6^{9}
2	(Spain) T Robredo	6	7^{11}

Quarterfinals
9	(South Korea) Lee H-T	7^{7}	4	6
2	(Spain) T Robredo	6^{3}	6	1
