= 2010 Rakuten Japan Open Tennis Championships – Doubles =

Doubles
- 2010 Rakuten Japan Open Tennis Championships

Final
- Champion: (United States) Eric Butorac (Netherlands Antilles) Jean-Julien Rojer
- Runner-up: (Italy) Andreas Seppi (Russia) Dmitry Tursunov
- Score: 6–3, 6–2

Details
- Draw: 16 (2WC)
- Seeds: 4

Events
Singles	Doubles
- Japan Open

Julian Knowle and Jürgen Melzer were the defending champions, but they lost to Marcelo Melo and Bruno Soares in the quarterfinal.
Eric Butorac and Jean-Julien Rojer won in the final 6–3, 6–2, against Andreas Seppi and Dmitry Tursunov.

== Seeds ==
1. (Austria) Julian Knowle / (Austria) Jürgen Melzer (quarterfinals)
2. (South Africa) Wesley Moodie / (Belgium) Dick Norman (first round)
3. (Sweden) Robert Lindstedt / (Romania) Horia Tecău (quarterfinals)
4. (Czech Republic) František Čermák / (Slovakia) Michal Mertiňák (semifinals)

== Draw ==
Key

- Q = Qualifier
- WC = Wild card
- LL = Lucky loser
- Alt = Alternate
- ITF = ITF entry
- PR = Protected ranking
- SR = Special ranking
- SE = Special exempt
- JE = Junior exempt
- JR = Junior Accelerator Programme entrant
- CO = College Accelerator Programme entrant
- NG = Next Gen Accelerator Program entrant
- w/o = Walkover
- r = Retired
- d = Defaulted

=== Draw ===
First round
1	(Austria) J Knowle (Austria) J Melzer	6^{5}	6	[10]
(France) R Gasquet (France) G Monfils	7^{7}	1	[7]
(Brazil) M Melo (Brazil) B Soares	6	6
(Spain) M López (Spain) D Marrero	1	3
3	(Sweden) R Lindstedt (Romania) H Tecău	6	6
(France) J Chardy (Argentina) E Schwank	3	3
(Australia) J Kerr (United States) R Ram	3	4
(United States) E Butorac (Netherlands Antilles) J-J Rojer	6	6
ALT	(Croatia) I Dodig (Spain) I Navarro	6	3	[4]
WC	(Japan) K Nishikori (Japan) G Soeda	4	6	[10]
(Netherlands) T de Bakker (United States) A Roddick	5	4
4	(Czech Republic) F Čermák (Slovakia) M Mertiňák	7	6
WC	(Japan) T Matsui (Japan) T Suzuki	6^{5}	7^{7}	[8]
ALT	(Italy) A Seppi (Russia) D Tursunov	7^{7}	6^{5}	[10]
(Germany) C Kas (Serbia) V Troicki	7^{7}	6
2	(South Africa) W Moodie (Belgium) D Norman	6^{3}	4

Quarterfinals
1	(Austria) J Knowle (Austria) J Melzer	2	2
(Brazil) M Melo (Brazil) B Soares	6	6
3	(Sweden) R Lindstedt (Romania) H Tecău	5	5
(United States) E Butorac (Netherlands Antilles) J-J Rojer	7	7
WC	(Japan) K Nishikori (Japan) G Soeda	3	2
4	(Czech Republic) F Čermák (Slovakia) M Mertiňák	6	6
ALT	(Italy) A Seppi (Russia) D Tursunov	6	7^{7}
(Germany) C Kas (Serbia) V Troicki	2	6^{3}

Semifinals
(Brazil) M Melo (Brazil) B Soares	7^{7}	6^{8}	[10]
(United States) E Butorac (Netherlands Antilles) J-J Rojer	6^{2}	7^{10}	[12]
4	(Czech Republic) F Čermák (Slovakia) M Mertiňák	3	6	[4]
ALT	(Italy) A Seppi (Russia) D Tursunov	6	3	[10]

Final
(United States) E Butorac (Netherlands Antilles) J-J Rojer	6	6
ALT	(Italy) A Seppi (Russia) D Tursunov	3	2
