= 2008 AIG Japan Open Tennis Championships – Men's doubles =

Men's doubles
- 2008 AIG Japan Open Tennis Championships

Final
- Champions: (Russia) Mikhail Youzhny (Germany) Mischa Zverev
- Runners-up: (Czech Republic) Lukáš Dlouhý (India) Leander Paes
- Score: 6–3, 6–4

Details
- Draw: 16 (2WC)
- Seeds: 4

Events
Singles	men	women
Doubles	men	women
- Japan Open

Jordan Kerr and Robert Lindstedt were the defending champions, but lost in the semifinals to Mikhail Youzhny and Mischa Zverev.

Mikhail Youzhny and Mischa Zverev won in the final 6–3, 6–4, against Lukáš Dlouhý and Leander Paes.

== Seeds ==
1. (Czech Republic) Lukáš Dlouhý / (India) Leander Paes (final)
2. (Sweden) Simon Aspelin / (Austria) Julian Knowle (quarterfinals)
3. (Australia) Jordan Kerr / (Sweden) Robert Lindstedt (semifinals)
4. (Czech Republic) František Čermák / (Netherlands) Rogier Wassen (first round)

== Draw ==
Key

- Q = Qualifier
- WC = Wild card
- LL = Lucky loser
- Alt = Alternate
- ITF = ITF entry
- PR = Protected ranking
- SR = Special ranking
- SE = Special exempt
- JE = Junior exempt
- JR = Junior Accelerator Programme entrant
- CO = College Accelerator Programme entrant
- NG = Next Gen Accelerator Program entrant
- w/o = Walkover
- r = Retired
- d = Defaulted

=== Draw ===
First round
1	(Czech Republic) L Dlouhý (India) L Paes	6	7
(Spain) G García López (Spain) I Navarro	4	5
ALT	(Japan) T Iwami (Japan) T Matsui	4	2
(Germany) P Petzschner (Austria) A Peya	6	6
4	(Czech Republic) F Čermák (Netherlands) R Wassen	3	2
(United States) J Cerretani (Australia) A Fisher	6	6
WC	(Japan) H Kondo (Japan) G Soeda	3	3
(United States) R Kendrick (Finland) J Nieminen	6	6
(United States) T Parrott (Slovakia) F Polášek	7^{7}	6
(United States) S Lipsky (United States) D Martin	6^{1}	1
(Germany) M Kohlmann (Germany) R Schüttler	4	6^{3}
3	(Australia) J Kerr (Sweden) R Lindstedt	6	7^{7}
WC	(Japan) S Iwabuchi (Japan) T Suzuki	4	6^{4}
(Russia) M Youzhny (Germany) M Zverev	6	7^{7}
(India) R Bopanna (United States) E Butorac	7^{7}	6^{4}	[4]
2	(Sweden) S Aspelin (Austria) J Knowle	6^{4}	7^{7}	[10]

Quarterfinals
1	(Czech Republic) L Dlouhý (India) L Paes	6	7^{7}
(Germany) P Petzschner (Austria) A Peya	2	6^{4}
(United States) J Cerretani (Australia) A Fisher	3	2
(United States) R Kendrick (Finland) J Nieminen	6	6
(United States) T Parrott (Slovakia) F Polášek	5	6^{2}
3	(Australia) J Kerr (Sweden) R Lindstedt	7	7^{7}
(Russia) M Youzhny (Germany) M Zverev	6	3	[10]
2	(Sweden) S Aspelin (Austria) J Knowle	1	6	[8]

Semifinals
1	(Czech Republic) L Dlouhý (India) L Paes	6	7^{7}
(United States) R Kendrick (Finland) J Nieminen	4	6^{4}
3	(Australia) J Kerr (Sweden) R Lindstedt	2	6	[8]
(Russia) M Youzhny (Germany) M Zverev	6	4	[10]

Final
1	(Czech Republic) L Dlouhý (India) L Paes	3	4
(Russia) M Youzhny (Germany) M Zverev	6	6
