= 2007 AIG Japan Open Tennis Championships – Men's singles =

Men's singles
- 2007 AIG Japan Open Tennis Championships

Final
- Champion: (Spain) David Ferrer
- Runner-up: (France) Richard Gasquet
- Score: 6–1, 6–2

Details
- Draw: 48 (6 Q / 4 WC )
- Seeds: 16

Events
Singles	men	women
Doubles	men	women
← 2006 ·	Japan Open	· 2008 →

Roger Federer was the defending champion, but chose not to participate in the 2007 event.

First-seeded David Ferrer beat Richard Gasquet in the final 6–1, 6–2.

== Seeds ==
All seeds receive a bye into the second round.

1. (Spain) David Ferrer (champion)
2. (Czech Republic) Tomáš Berdych (semifinals)
3. (France) Richard Gasquet (final)
4. (Australia) Lleyton Hewitt (quarterfinals)
5. (Finland) Jarkko Nieminen (second round)
6. (Russia) Dmitry Tursunov (third round)
7. (Croatia) Ivo Karlović (semifinals)
8. (Spain) Fernando Verdasco (quarterfinals)
9. (South Korea) Hyung-taik Lee (third round)
10. (Spain) Feliciano López (quarterfinals)
11. (Argentina) Juan Martín del Potro (second round, retired due to a leg injury)
12. (Sweden) Thomas Johansson (third round)
13. (United States) Sam Querrey (second round)
14. (Argentina) Sergio Roitman (second round)
15. (Canada) Frank Dancevic (second round)
16. (United States) Michael Russell (third round)

== Draw ==
=== Key ===
- Q = Qualifier
- WC = Wild card
- LL = Lucky loser
- Alt = Alternate
- SE = Special exempt
- PR = Protected ranking
- ITF = ITF entry
- JE = Junior exempt
- w/o = Walkover
- r = Retired
- d = Defaulted
- SR = Special ranking

=== Finals ===
Quarterfinals
1	(Spain) David Ferrer	6	6
10	(Spain) Feliciano López	4	4
4	(Australia) Lleyton Hewitt	6^{5}	6^{6}
7	(Croatia) Ivo Karlović	7^{7}	7^{8}
(Israel) Dudi Sela	4	1
3	(France) Richard Gasquet	6	6
8	(Spain) Fernando Verdasco	6^{7}	6	5
2	(Czech Republic) Tomáš Berdych	7^{9}	4	7

Semifinals
1	(Spain) David Ferrer	7^{7}	6
7	(Croatia) Ivo Karlović	6^{3}	3
3	(France) Richard Gasquet	7^{7}	6
2	(Czech Republic) Tomáš Berdych	6^{3}	3

Final
1	(Spain) David Ferrer	6	6
3	(France) Richard Gasquet	1	2

=== Top half ===
==== Section 1 ====
First round
(Italy) S Bolelli	6^{6}	6^{8}
(South Africa) W Moodie	7^{8}	7^{10}
(United States) A Delić	3	1
(United States) V Spadea	6	6
Q	(South Korea) H-w Nam	6^{5}	7^{9}	3
(United States) R Kendrick	7^{7}	6^{7}	6
(Chile) P Capdeville	7^{7}	7
(Russia) T Gabashvili	6^{4}	5

Second round
1	(Spain) D Ferrer	7^{7}	6
(South Africa) W Moodie	6^{5}	2
(United States) V Spadea	4	6	7^{9}
14	(Argentina) S Roitman	6	1	6^{7}
10	(Spain) F López	6	6
(United States) R Kendrick	2	4
(Chile) P Capdeville	4	3
6	(Russia) D Tursunov	6	6

Third round
1	(Spain) D Ferrer	6	7^{7}
(United States) V Spadea	1	6^{0}
10	(Spain) F López	7^{10}	6
6	(Russia) D Tursunov	6^{8}	4

Quarterfinals
1	(Spain) D Ferrer	6	6
10	(Spain) F López	4	4

==== Section 2 ====
First round
Q	(Slovenia) L Gregorc	6	6
Q	(Japan) T Terachi	4	4
(Spain) I Navarro	7^{7}	7^{7}
(Netherlands) R Haase	6^{5}	6^{0}
(Chinese Taipei) Y-h Lu	6^{4}	7^{9}	6
(Thailand) D Udomchoke	7^{7}	6^{7}	1
(Germany) B Becker	7	3	6
WC	(Japan) T Suzuki	5	6	4

Second round
4	(Australia) L Hewitt	6	6
Q	(Slovenia) L Gregorc	3	3
(Spain) I Navarro	7	6
13	(United States) S Querrey	5	3
9	(South Korea) Hyung-taik Lee	6	6
(Chinese Taipei) Yen-hsun Lu	1	4
(Germany) B Becker	4	3
7	(Croatia) I Karlović	6	6

Third round
4	(Australia) L Hewitt	7	6
(Spain) I Navarro	5	3
9	(South Korea) Hyung-yaik Lee	6^{6}	7^{10}	6^{8}
7	(Croatia) I Karlović	7^{8}	6^{8}	7^{10}

Quarterfinals
4	(Australia) L Hewitt	6^{5}	6^{6}
7	(Croatia) I Karlović	7^{7}	7^{8}

=== Bottom half ===
==== Section 3 ====
First round
Q	(Switzerland) J-C Scherrer	6^{5}	6	5
(Serbia) B Pašanski	7^{7}	1	7
Q	(Germany) S Stadler	4	5
(Israel) D Sela	6	7
WC	(Japan) G Soeda	3	6	2
(Germany) R Schüttler	6	1	6
(United States) Z Fleishman	7^{7}	3	6
WC	(Japan) K Nishikori	6^{5}	6	1

Second round
5	(Finland) J Nieminen	3	6	4
(Serbia) B Pašanski	6	4	6
(Israel) D Sela	2	7	5
11	(Argentina) JM del Potro	6	5	3^{r}
15	(Canada) F Dancevic	2	6	2
(Germany) R Schüttler	6	4	6
(United States) Z Fleishman	3	3
3	(France) R Gasquet	6	6

Third round
(Serbia) B Pašanski	2	0^{r}
(Israel) D Sela	6	4
(Germany) R Schüttler	2	2
3	(France) R Gasquet	6	6

Quarterfinals
(Israel) D Sela	4	1
3	(France) R Gasquet	6	6

==== Section 4 ====
First round
(Italy) F Fognini	1	6^{9}
(Germany) M Zverev	6	7^{11}
(United States) J Gimelstob	6	7
(Poland) L Kubot	4	5
(Croatia) M Čilić	6	6
Q	(South Korea) W-s Jun	2	2
WC	(Japan) S Iwabuchi	4	4
(Czech Republic) J Vaněk	6	6

Second round
8	(Spain) F Verdasco	6	6
(Germany) M Zverev	3	2
(United States) J Gimelstob	4	4
12	(Sweden) T Johansson	6	6
16	(United States) M Russell	7^{7}	2	6
(Croatia) M Čilić	6^{2}	6	1
(Czech Republic) J Vaněk	1	4
2	(Czech Republic) T Berdych	6	6

Third round
8	(Spain) F Verdasco	7^{7}	5	6
12	(Sweden) T Johansson	6^{4}	7	3
16	(United States) M Russell	4	2
2	(Czech Republic) T Berdych	6	6

Quarterfinals
8	(Spain) F Verdasco	6^{7}	6	5
2	(Czech Republic) T Berdych	7^{9}	4	7
