= 2009 Rakuten Japan Open Tennis Championships – Singles =

Singles
- 2009 Rakuten Japan Open Tennis Championships

Final
- Champion: (France) Jo-Wilfried Tsonga
- Runner-up: (Russia) Mikhail Youzhny
- Score: 6–3, 6–3

Details
- Draw: 32 (4Q / 3WC)
- Seeds: 8

Events
Singles	Doubles
← 2008 ·	Japan Open	· 2010 →

Tomáš Berdych was the defending champion, but he lost in the quarterfinals to Mikhail Youzhny.

Second-seeded Jo-Wilfried Tsonga won in the final 6–3, 6–3 against Mikhail Youzhny.

== Seeds ==
1. (Argentina) Juan Martín del Potro (first round)
2. (France) Jo-Wilfried Tsonga (champion)
3. (France) Gilles Simon (second round)
4. (France) Gaël Monfils (semifinals)
5. (Czech Republic) Tomáš Berdych (quarterfinals)
6. (Czech Republic) Radek Štěpánek (first round)
7. (Switzerland) Stanislas Wawrinka (quarterfinals)
8. (Australia) Lleyton Hewitt (semifinals)

== Draw ==
=== Key ===
- Q = Qualifier
- WC = Wild card
- LL = Lucky loser
- Alt = Alternate
- SE = Special exempt
- PR = Protected ranking
- ITF = ITF entry
- JE = Junior exempt
- w/o = Walkover
- r = Retired
- d = Defaulted
- SR = Special ranking

=== Finals ===
Semifinals
8	(Australia) Lleyton Hewitt	2	7	5
(Russia) Mikhail Youzhny	6	5	7
4	(France) Gaël Monfils	3	3
2	(France) Jo-Wilfried Tsonga	6	6

Final
(Russia) Mikhail Youzhny	3	3
2	(France) Jo-Wilfried Tsonga	6	6

=== Top half ===
First round
1	(Argentina) JM del Potro	4	4
Q	(France) É Roger-Vasselin	6	6
(Austria) J Melzer	7^{7}	6
(Argentina) L Mayer	6^{4}	3
(Kazakhstan) A Golubev	7^{7}	6^{2}	2
(France) F Santoro	6^{5}	7^{7}	6
WC	(Japan) T Ito	1	5
8	(Australia) L Hewitt	6	7
3	(France) G Simon	6	6
WC	(Japan) T Suzuki	3	4
(Brazil) T Bellucci	2	3
(Russia) M Youzhny	6	6
(Germany) A Beck	6	4	7^{7}
(Germany) R Schüttler	3	6	6^{3}
WC	(Japan) G Soeda	2	4
5	(Czech Republic) T Berdych	6	6

Second round
Q	(France) É Roger-Vasselin	4	6	6
(Austria) J Melzer	6	2	3
(France) F Santoro	6	3	1
8	(Australia) L Hewitt	3	6	6
3	(France) G Simon	6^{5}	7^{7}	4
(Russia) M Youzhny	7^{7}	6^{5}	6
(Germany) A Beck	4	1
5	(Czech Republic) T Berdych	6	6

Quarterfinals
Q	(France) É Roger-Vasselin	4	0
8	(Australia) L Hewitt	6	6
(Russia) M Youzhny	6	7^{10}
5	(Czech Republic) T Berdych	2	6^{8}

Semifinals
8	(Australia) L Hewitt	2	7	5
(Russia) M Youzhny	6	5	7

=== Bottom half ===
First round
7	(Switzerland) S Wawrinka	6	6
(United States) J Isner	4	4
(Germany) S Greul	4	6	6
(Argentina) M Vassallo Argüello	6	4	2
Q	(Switzerland) M Chiudinelli	4	6	6
(Israel) D Sela	6	1	4
Q	(Turkey) M İlhan	2	4
4	(France) G Monfils	6	6
6	(Czech Republic) R Štěpánek	4	4
Q	(Latvia) E Gulbis	6	6
(Argentina) J Mónaco	5
(Spain) G García-López	0^{r}
(France) R Gasquet	6	6
(Germany) P Petzschner	3	2
(Germany) M Zverev	4	3
2	(France) J-W Tsonga	6	6

Second round
7	(Switzerland) S Wawrinka	6	6
(Germany) S Greul	3	2
Q	(Switzerland) M Chiudinelli	6^{5}	3
4	(France) G Monfils	7^{7}	6
Q	(Latvia) E Gulbis	6	4
(Argentina) J Mónaco	3	1^{r}
(France) R Gasquet	6	2	2
2	(France) J-W Tsonga	4	6	6

Quarterfinals
7	(Switzerland) S Wawrinka	6	3	4
4	(France) G Monfils	2	6	6
Q	(Latvia) E Gulbis	6	4	3
2	(France) J-W Tsonga	4	6	6

Semifinals
4	(France) G Monfils	3	3
2	(France) J-W Tsonga	6	6

== Qualifying ==
=== Seeds ===
1. (Latvia) Ernests Gulbis (qualified)
2. (Switzerland) Marco Chiudinelli (qualified)
3. (India) Somdev Devvarman (first round)
4. (France) Édouard Roger-Vasselin (qualified)
5. (South Korea) Im Kyu-tae (qualifying competition)
6. (Turkey) Marsel İlhan (qualified)
7. (Germany) Dominik Meffert (qualifying competition)
8. (South Africa) Rik de Voest (qualifying competition)

=== Qualifiers ===
1. (Latvia) Ernests Gulbis
2. (Switzerland) Marco Chiudinelli
3. (Turkey) Marsel İlhan
4. (France) Édouard Roger-Vasselin

=== Draw ===
==== First qualifier ====
First round
1	(Latvia) Ernests Gulbis	6	6
(Japan) Junn Mitsuhashi	2	3
WC	(Japan) Yuichi Ito	3	2
7	(Germany) Dominik Meffert	6	6

Qualifying competition
1	(Latvia) Ernests Gulbis	6^{3}	6	6
7	(Germany) Dominik Meffert	7^{7}	3	4

==== Second qualifier ====
First round
2	(Switzerland) Marco Chiudinelli	6	6
(Slovenia) Luka Gregorc	3	4
WC	(Japan) Hiroyasu Ehara	6	2	3
5	(South Korea) Im Kyu-tae	0	6	6

Qualifying competition
2	(Switzerland) Marco Chiudinelli	6^{6}	6	6
5	(South Korea) Im Kyu-tae	7^{8}	4	2

==== Third qualifier ====
First round
3	(India) Somdev Devvarman	6	5	4
(Japan) Yūichi Sugita	3	7	6
(Japan) Hiroki Kondo	3	4
6	(Turkey) Marsel İlhan	6	6

Qualifying competition
(Japan) Yūichi Sugita	6^{4}	1
6	(Turkey) Marsel İlhan	7^{7}	6

==== Fourth qualifier ====
First round
4	(France) Édouard Roger-Vasselin	6	6
(Austria) Alexander Peya	2	4
WC	(Japan) Hiroki Moriya	4	6^{3}
8	(South Africa) Rik de Voest	6	7^{7}

Qualifying competition
4	(France) Édouard Roger-Vasselin	3	6	6
8	(South Africa) Rik de Voest	6	3	4
