= 2006 AIG Japan Open Tennis Championships – Women's doubles =

Women's doubles
- 2006 AIG Japan Open Tennis Championships

Final
- Champions: (United States) Vania King (Croatia) Jelena Kostanić
- Runners-up: (Chinese Taipei) Chan Yung-jan (Chinese Taipei) Chuang Chia-jung
- Score: 7–6^{(7–2)}, 5–7, 6–2

Details
- Draw: 16 (1Q / 1WC)
- Seeds: 4

Events
Singles	men	women
Doubles	men	women
- Japan Open

Gisela Dulko and Maria Kirilenko were the defending champions, but Kirilenko did not compete this year to focus only on the singles tournament. Dulko teamed up with Yan Zi and had to withdraw in the quarterfinal match against Natalie Grandin and Camille Pin.

Vania King and Jelena Kostanić won the title by defeating Chan Yung-jan and Chuang Chia-jung 7–6^{(7–2)}, 5–7, 6–2 in the final.

== Seeds ==
1. (Spain) Virginia Ruano Pascual / (Argentina) Paola Suárez (semifinals, withdrew due to a right calf strain on Suárez)
2. (Argentina) Gisela Dulko / (China) Yan Zi (quarterfinals, withdrew)
3. (Greece) ~~Eleni Daniilidou~~ / (Spain) ~~Anabel Medina Garrigues~~ (withdrew due to a left calf strain on Daniilidou)
4. (Australia) ~~Alicia Molik~~ / (United States) ~~Meghann Shaughnessy~~ (withdrew due to a respiratory illness on Shaughnessy)

== Draw ==
Key

- Q = Qualifier
- WC = Wild card
- LL = Lucky loser
- Alt = Alternate
- ITF = ITF entry
- PR = Protected ranking
- SR = Special ranking
- SE = Special exempt
- JE = Junior exempt
- JR = Junior Accelerator Programme entrant
- CO = College Accelerator Programme entrant
- NG = Next Gen Accelerator Program entrant
- w/o = Walkover
- r = Retired
- d = Defaulted

=== Draw ===
First round
1	(Spain) V Ruano Pascual (Argentina) P Suárez	6	6
(Japan) A Morigami (Japan) A Nakamura	2	2
(Poland) M Domachowska (Russia) A Jidkova	6	6
(Japan) K Taguchi (Japan) A Takase	3	3
LL	(Japan) K Iijima (Japan) J Namigata	1	6	1
(Chinese Taipei) Y-j Chan (Chinese Taipei) C-j Chuang	6	3	6
(Argentina) M Díaz Oliva (Germany) J Schruff	6	7^{8}
Q	(Germany) A Matic (Denmark) C Wozniacki	4	6^{6}
(Latvia) L Dekmeijere (India) S Uberoi	7	6
(Finland) E Laine (United States) L Osterloh	5	4
(United States) V King (Croatia) J Kostanić	6	4	6
LL	(Japan) Y Sema (Japan) M Tanaka	3	6	1
(South Africa) N Grandin (France) C Pin	7	6
WC	(Japan) M Arai (Japan) S Okamoto	5	2
(Colombia) C Castaño (United States) J Craybas	3	2
2	(Argentina) G Dulko (China) Z Yan	6	6

Quarterfinals
1	(Spain) V Ruano Pascual (Argentina) P Suárez	3	7	6
(Poland) M Domachowska (Russia) A Jidkova	6	5	0
(Chinese Taipei) Y-j Chan (Chinese Taipei) C-j Chuang	6	6
(Argentina) M Díaz Oliva (Germany) J Schruff	3	2
(Latvia) L Dekmeijere (India) S Uberoi	6^{5}	2
(United States) V King (Croatia) J Kostanić	7^{7}	6
(South Africa) N Grandin (France) C Pin	w/o
2	(Argentina) G Dulko (China) Z Yan

Semifinals
1	(Spain) V Ruano Pascual (Argentina) P Suárez
(Chinese Taipei) Y-j Chan (Chinese Taipei) C-j Chuang	w/o
(United States) V King (Croatia) J Kostanić	6	6
(South Africa) N Grandin (France) C Pin	3	1

Final
(Chinese Taipei) Y-j Chan (Chinese Taipei) C-j Chuang	6^{2}	7	2
(United States) V King (Croatia) J Kostanić	7^{7}	5	6

== Qualifying draw ==
=== Seeds ===
1. (Japan) Kumiko Iijima / (Japan) Junri Namigata (first round, lucky losers)
2. (Germany) Antonia Matic / (Denmark) Caroline Wozniacki (qualified)

=== Qualifiers ===
1. (Germany) Antonia Matic / (Denmark) Caroline Wozniacki

=== Lucky losers ===
1. (Japan) Kumiko Iijima / (Japan) Junri Namigata
2. (Japan) Yurika Sema / (Japan) Mari Tanaka

=== Draw ===
First round
1	(Japan) Kumiko Iijima (Japan) Junri Namigata	3
(Romania) Raluca Olaru (United States) Abigail Spears	8
WC	(Japan) Yurika Sema (Japan) Mari Tanaka	3
2	(Germany) Antonia Matic (Denmark) Caroline Wozniacki	8

Qualifying competition
(Romania) Raluca Olaru (United States) Abigail Spears
2	(Germany) Antonia Matic (Denmark) Caroline Wozniacki	w/o

Raluca Olaru and Abigail Spears withdrew from the qualifying competition, with Spears citing personal reasons.
