= 2007 AIG Japan Open Tennis Championships =

- Date: 1–7 October
- Edition: 34th
- Surface: Hard / outdoor
- Location: Tokyo, Japan
- Venue: Ariake Coliseum

Champions

Men's singles
- (Spain) David Ferrer

Women's singles
- (France) Virginie Razzano

Men's doubles
- (Australia) Jordan Kerr / (Sweden) Robert Lindstedt

Women's doubles
- (China) Sun Tiantian / (China) Yan Zi
← 2006 ·	Japan Open	· 2008 →

The 2007 AIG Japan Open Tennis Championships was a tennis tournament played on outdoor hard courts. It was the 34th edition of the event known that year as the AIG Japan Open Tennis Championships, and was part of the International Series Gold of the 2007 ATP Tour, and of the Tier III Series of the 2007 WTA Tour. Both the men's and the women's events took place at the Ariake Coliseum in Tokyo, Japan, from October 1 through October 7, 2007.

The men's draw included ATP No. 8, US Open semifinalist, Auckland and Båstad champion David Ferrer, Wimbledon quarterfinalist, Halle winner Tomáš Berdych, and Wimbledon semifinalist, Estoril runner-up and Mumbai titlist Richard Gasquet. Also lined up were Las Vegas champion Lleyton Hewitt, Marseille and Halle semifinalist Jarkko Nieminen, Dmitry Tursunov, Ivo Karlović and Fernando Verdasco.

The women's field was led by WTA No. 8, Wimbledon, Memphis and Seoul champion Venus Williams, recent Stanford and New Haven doubles titlist Sania Mirza, and Seoul runner-up, Kolkata winner Maria Kirilenko. Also present were French Open and Wimbledon doubles finalist Ai Sugiyama, Guangzhou titlist Virginie Razzano, Akiko Morigami, Aiko Nakamura and Flavia Pennetta.

== Finals ==
=== Men's singles ===
(Spain) David Ferrer defeated (France) Richard Gasquet, 6–1, 6–2

- It was David Ferrer's 3rd title of the year and his 5th overall.

=== Women's singles ===
(France) Virginie Razzano defeated (United States) Venus Williams, 4–6, 7–6^{(9–7)}, 6–4

- It was Virginie Razzano's 2nd title this year, and overall.

=== Men's doubles ===
(Australia) Jordan Kerr / (Sweden) Robert Lindstedt defeated (Canada) Frank Dancevic / (Australia) Stephen Huss, 6–3, 6–3

=== Women's doubles ===
(China) Sun Tiantian / (China) Yan Zi defeated (Chinese Taipei) Chia-jung Chuang / (United States) Vania King, 1–6, 6–2, [10–6]
