= 2008 AIG Japan Open Tennis Championships – Women's doubles =

Women's doubles
- 2008 AIG Japan Open Tennis Championships

Final
- Champions: (United States) Jill Craybas (New Zealand) Marina Erakovic
- Runners-up: (Japan) Ayumi Morita (Japan) Aiko Nakamura
- Score: 4–6, 7–5, [10–6]

Details
- Draw: 16 (1WC)
- Seeds: 4

Events
Singles	men	women
Doubles	men	women
- AIG Japan Open Tennis Championships

Sun Tiantian and Yan Zi were the defending champions, but Yan chose not to participate, and only Sun competed that year.
Sun partnered with Vania King, but lost in the semifinals to Aiko Nakamura and Ayumi Morita.

Jill Craybas and Marina Erakovic won in the final 4–6, 7–5, [10–6], against Aiko Nakamura and Ayumi Morita.

== Seeds ==
1. (Czech Republic) Iveta Benešová / (Israel) Shahar Pe'er (first round)
2. (United States) Vania King / (China) Sun Tiantian (semifinals)
3. (Chinese Taipei) Chia-jung Chuang / (Chinese Taipei) Su-wei Hsieh (first round)
4. (Argentina) Gisela Dulko / (Russia) Maria Kirilenko (first round, withdrew due to a left hip injury for Kirilenko)

== Draw ==
Key

- Q = Qualifier
- WC = Wild card
- LL = Lucky loser
- Alt = Alternate
- ITF = ITF entry
- PR = Protected ranking
- SR = Special ranking
- SE = Special exempt
- JE = Junior exempt
- JR = Junior Accelerator Programme entrant
- CO = College Accelerator Programme entrant
- NG = Next Gen Accelerator Program entrant
- w/o = Walkover
- r = Retired
- d = Defaulted

=== Draw ===
First round
1	(Czech Republic) I Benešová (Israel) S Pe'er	1	6	[5]
(Japan) J Namigata (Japan) A Yonemura	6	4	[10]
(United States) J Craybas (New Zealand) M Erakovic	6	6
(Canada) S Dubois (United States) C Fusano	4	2
4	(Argentina) G Dulko (Russia) M Kirilenko
(Russia) A Pavlyuchenkova (Belgium) Y Wickmayer	w/o
(Chinese Taipei) Y-j Chan (Italy) M Santangelo	6	7
(Russia) M Kondratieva (France) S Lefèvre	1	6^{4}
WC	(Japan) K Date-Krumm (Japan) R Fujiwara	6	6^{4}	[10]
(Czech Republic) P Cetkovská (Czech Republic) L Šafářová	4	7	[7]
(Japan) A Morita (Japan) A Nakamura	4	6	[10]
3	(Chinese Taipei) C-j Chuang (Chinese Taipei) S-w Hsieh	6	4	[6]
(India) S Uberoi (United States) M Washington	6	6
(Poland) M Domachowska (Czech Republic) K Zakopalová	4	4
(Chinese Taipei) C-w Chan (South Africa) N Grandin	2	5
2	(United States) V King (China) T Sun	6	7

Quarterfinals
(Japan) J Namigata (Japan) A Yonemura	6	6^{5}	[9]
(United States) J Craybas (New Zealand) M Erakovic	4	7	[11]
(Russia) A Pavlyuchenkova (Belgium) Y Wickmayer	6^{4}	6	[15]
(Chinese Taipei) Y-j Chan (Italy) M Santangelo	7	3	[13]
WC	(Japan) K Date-Krumm (Japan) R Fujiwara	2	6	[5]
(Japan) A Morita (Japan) A Nakamura	6	1	[10]
(India) S Uberoi (United States) M Washington	3	4
2	(United States) V King (China) T Sun	6	6

Semifinals
(United States) J Craybas (New Zealand) M Erakovic	6	6
(Russia) A Pavlyuchenkova (Belgium) Y Wickmayer	4	1
(Japan) A Morita (Japan) A Nakamura	7	6
2	(United States) V King (China) T Sun	5	2

Final
(United States) J Craybas (New Zealand) M Erakovic	4	7	[10]
(Japan) A Morita (Japan) A Nakamura	6	5	[6]
