= 2005 AIG Japan Open Tennis Championships – Women's doubles =

Women's doubles
- 2005 AIG Japan Open Tennis Championships

Final
- Champions: (Argentina) Gisela Dulko (Russia) Maria Kirilenko
- Runners-up: (Japan) Shinobu Asagoe (Venezuela) María Vento-Kabchi
- Score: 7–5, 4–6, 6–3

Details
- Draw: 16 (1Q / 2WC)
- Seeds: 4

Events
Singles	men	women
Doubles	men	women
- Japan Open

Shinobu Asagoe and Katarina Srebotnik were the defending champions, but Srebotnik did not compete this year. Asagoe teamed up with María Vento-Kabchi and lost in the final 7–5, 4–6, 6–3 against Gisela Dulko and Maria Kirilenko.

It was the 2nd WTA title for both Dulko and Kirilenko in their respective doubles careers.

== Seeds ==
1. (Japan) Shinobu Asagoe / (Venezuela) María Vento-Kabchi (final)
2. (Argentina) Gisela Dulko / (Russia) Maria Kirilenko (champions)
3. (Italy) Tathiana Garbin / (Australia) Nicole Pratt (quarterfinals)
4. (Australia) Lisa McShea / (Australia) Bryanne Stewart (quarterfinals)

== Draw ==
Key

- Q = Qualifier
- WC = Wild card
- LL = Lucky loser
- Alt = Alternate
- ITF = ITF entry
- PR = Protected ranking
- SR = Special ranking
- SE = Special exempt
- JE = Junior exempt
- JR = Junior Accelerator Programme entrant
- CO = College Accelerator Programme entrant
- NG = Next Gen Accelerator Program entrant
- w/o = Walkover
- r = Retired
- d = Defaulted

First round
1	(Japan) A Asagoe (Venezuela) M Vento-Kabchi	6	7
(United States) L Granville (United States) A Spears	3	5
(Chinese Taipei) C-w Chan (Chinese Taipei) S-w Hsieh	3	6	1
(Chinese Taipei) C-j Chuang (Japan) R Fujiwara	6	2	6
4	(Australia) L McShea (Australia) B Stewart	6	6
WC	(Romania) R Olaru (Japan) E Sema	1	2
Q	(Japan) A Morigami (Japan) M Saeki	0	6	1
(France) S Foretz (Slovakia) H Nagyová	6	3	6
(India) S Mirza (Israel) S Pe'er	3	6	6
(United States) J Craybas (United States) C Gullickson	6	3	1
(United States) A Harkleroad (Australia) T Musgrave	3	4
3	(Italy) T Garbin (Australia) N Pratt	6	6
WC	(Japan) A Morita (Japan) A Sugiyama	4	1
(United States) J Hopkins (United States) M Washington	6	6
(South Africa) N Grandin (Germany) M Müller	6	2	6^{8}
2	(Argentina) G Dulko (Russia) M Kirilenko	2	6	7^{10}

Quarterfinals
1	(Japan) A Asagoe (Venezuela) M Vento-Kabchi	6	3	7^{8}
(Chinese Taipei) C-j Chuang (Japan) R Fujiwara	4	6	6^{6}
4	(Australia) L McShea (Australia) B Stewart	3	0
(France) S Foretz (Slovakia) H Nagyová	6	6
(India) S Mirza (Israel) S Pe'er	6	6
3	(Italy) T Garbin (Australia) N Pratt	2	1
(United States) J Hopkins (United States) M Washington	3	4
2	(Argentina) G Dulko (Russia) M Kirilenko	6	6

Semifinals
1	(Japan) A Asagoe (Venezuela) M Vento-Kabchi	6	6
(France) S Foretz (Slovakia) H Nagyová	4	4
(India) S Mirza (Israel) S Pe'er	1	4
2	(Argentina) G Dulko (Russia) M Kirilenko	6	6

Final
1	(Japan) A Asagoe (Venezuela) M Vento-Kabchi	5	6	3
2	(Argentina) G Dulko (Russia) M Kirilenko	7	4	6
