= 2009 Keio Challenger – Singles =

Singles
- 2009 Keio Challenger

Final
- Champion: (Japan) Takao Suzuki
- Runner-up: (Austria) Martin Fischer
- Score: 6–4, 7–6(5)

Events
Singles	Doubles
← 2008 ·	Keio Challenger	· 2010 →

Lee Hyung-taik was the defending champion, but he retired from playing tournaments before this event.
Takao Suzuki won in the final 6–4, 7–6(5), against Martin Fischer.

== Seeds ==
1. (Japan) Go Soeda (semifinals)
2. (South Korea) Im Kyu-tae (quarterfinals)
3. (Germany) Dieter Kindlmann (quarterfinals)
4. (Japan) Tatsuma Ito (second round)
5. (Austria) Philipp Oswald (semifinals)
6. (Slovakia) Pavol Červenák (first round)
7. (Australia) Nick Lindahl (second round)
8. (Austria) Martin Fischer (final)

== Draw ==
=== Key ===
- Q = Qualifier
- WC = Wild card
- LL = Lucky loser
- Alt = Alternate
- ITF = ITF entry
- PR = Protected ranking
- SR = Special ranking
- SE = Special exempt
- JE = Junior exempt
- JR = Junior Accelerator Programme entrant
- CO = College Accelerator Programme entrant
- NG = Next Gen Accelerator Program entrant
- w/o = Walkover
- r = Retired
- d = Defaulted

=== Finals ===
Semifinals
1	(Japan) Go Soeda	3	4
8	(Austria) Martin Fischer	6	6
5	(Austria) Philipp Oswald	5	1
(Japan) Takao Suzuki	7	6

Final
8	(Austria) Martin Fischer	4	6^{5}
(Japan) Takao Suzuki	6	7

=== Top half ===
First round
1	(Japan) G Soeda	7	6
(Kazakhstan) A Kedryuk	6^{3}	2
WC	(Japan) J Mitsuhashi	7	4	6
Q	(Chinese Taipei) C-h Yi	5	6	2
(Netherlands) J Huta Galung	3	4
(Chinese Taipei) T-h Yang	6	6
(New Zealand) J Statham	4	7	7
6	(Slovakia) P Červenák	6	6^{4}	6^{6}
4	(Japan) T Ito	6	3	6
(Germany) S Stadler	4	6	3
WC	(Japan) K Matsunaga	3	0
(Belarus) V Ignatik	6	6
Q	(Japan) Y Ito	6	3	6
(Australia) G Jones	4	6	3
Q	(Chinese Taipei) T Chen	0	0
8	(Austria) M Fischer	6	6

Second round
1	(Japan) G Soeda	6	6
WC	(Japan) J Mitsuhashi	2	1
(Chinese Taipei) T-h Yang	6	6
(New Zealand) J Statham	3	3
4	(Japan) T Ito	6	4	2
(Belarus) V Ignatik	4	6	6
Q	(Japan) Y Ito	6	2	0
8	(Austria) M Fischer	4	6	6

Quarterfinals
1	(Japan) G Soeda	6	6
(Chinese Taipei) T-h Yang	4	2
(Belarus) V Ignatik	6	3	3
8	(Austria) M Fischer	4	6	6

Semifinals
1	(Japan) G Soeda	3	4
8	(Austria) M Fischer	6	6

=== Bottom half ===
First round
5	(Austria) P Oswald	6
Q	(Russia) A Kudryavtsev	3	r
(Croatia) G Tošić	3	0
(Japan) H Moriya	6	6
(Latvia) A Juška	1	2
(Republic of Ireland) L Sorensen	6	6
WC	(Japan) T Matsui	3	4
3	(Germany) D Kindlmann	6	6
7	(Australia) N Lindahl	6	7
(Australia) S Kadir	2	5
(Switzerland) A Sadecky	2	4
(Japan) T Suzuki	6	6
WC	(Japan) S Aida	2	2
(Japan) Y Sugita	6	6
(Croatia) N Mektić	6	2	6^{7}
2	(South Korea) K-t Im	3	6	7

Second round
5	(Austria) P Oswald	6	6
(Japan) H Moriya	3	4
(Republic of Ireland) L Sorensen	1	r
3	(Germany) D Kindlmann	4
7	(Australia) N Lindahl	4	4
(Japan) T Suzuki	6	6
(Japan) Y Sugita	4	0
2	(South Korea) K-t Im	6	6

Quarterfinals
5	(Austria) P Oswald	6	6
3	(Germany) D Kindlmann	4	4
(Japan) T Suzuki	6	6
2	(South Korea) K-t Im	3	1

Semifinals
5	(Austria) P Oswald	5	1
(Japan) T Suzuki	7	6
