= 2005 AIG Japan Open Tennis Championships – Women's singles =

Women's singles
- 2005 AIG Japan Open Tennis Championships

Final
- Champion: (Czech Republic) Nicole Vaidišová
- Runner-up: (France) Tatiana Golovin
- Score: 7–6^{(7–4)}, 3–2^{r}

Details
- Draw: 32 (4 Q / 2 WC )
- Seeds: 8

Events
Singles	men	women
Doubles	men	women
← 2004 ·	Japan Open	· 2006 →

Maria Sharapova was the two-time defending champion, but decided not to participate that year.

Second-seeded Nicole Vaidišová was leading 7–6^{(7–4)}, 3–2 in the final against third-seeded Tatiana Golovin, when Golovin retired due to an achilles tendon injury, giving Vaidišová the title. This remains one of the youngest finals in WTA history.

== Seeds ==
1. (Russia) Vera Zvonareva (quarterfinals)
2. (Czech Republic) Nicole Vaidišová (champion)
3. (France) Tatiana Golovin (final, retired due to an achilles tendon injury)
4. (Russia) Maria Kirilenko (semifinals)
5. (Japan) Ai Sugiyama (quarterfinals)
6. (Argentina) Gisela Dulko (second round)
7. (Japan) Shinobu Asagoe (second round)
8. (India) Sania Mirza (semifinals)

== Draw ==
=== Key ===
- Q = Qualifier
- WC = Wild card
- LL = Lucky loser
- Alt = Alternate
- ITF = ITF entry
- PR = Protected ranking
- SR = Special ranking
- SE = Special exempt
- JE = Junior exempt
- JR = Junior Accelerator Programme entrant
- CO = College Accelerator Programme entrant
- NG = Next Gen Accelerator Program entrant
- w/o = Walkover
- r = Retired
- d = Defaulted

=== Finals ===
Semifinals
8	(India) Sania Mirza	2	4
3	(France) Tatiana Golovin	6	6
4	(Russia) Maria Kirilenko	4	2
2	(Czech Republic) Nicole Vaidišová	6	6

Final
3	(France) Tatiana Golovin	6^{4}	2^{r}
2	(Czech Republic) Nicole Vaidišová	7^{7}	3

=== Top half ===
First round
1	(Russia) V Zvonareva	6	7^{7}
(Colombia) C Castaño	2	6^{4}
(France) M Bartoli	4	4
(Israel) S Pe'er	6	6
(United States) M Washington	7^{8}	1	1
(Japan) A Nakamura	6^{6}	6	6
Q	(Puerto Rico) V Castellvi	1	3
8	(India) S Mirza	6	6
3	(France) T Golovin	6	6
(United States) A Spears	4	2
(Slovakia) M Suchá	1	0
WC	(Japan) S Obata	6	6
(France) C Pin	5	6	6
(United States) L Granville	7	1	4
(Russia) A Jidkova	1	6^{5}
5	(Japan) A Sugiyama	6	7^{7}

Second round
1	(Russia) V Zvonareva	6	7
(Israel) S Pe'er	3	5
(Japan) A Nakamura	1	4
8	(India) S Mirza	6	6
3	(France) T Golovin	6	6
WC	(Japan) S Obata	1	4
(France) C Pin	6	3	4
5	(Japan) A Sugiyama	3	6	6

Quarterfinals
1	(Russia) V Zvonareva	7	2	4
8	(India) S Mirza	5	6	6
3	(France) T Golovin	3	6	6
5	(Japan) A Sugiyama	6	2	2

Semifinals
8	(India) S Mirza	2	4
3	(France) T Golovin	6	6

=== Bottom half ===
First round
6	(Argentina) G Dulko	2	7	6
Q	(Chinese Taipei) S-w Hsieh	6	5	2
(United States) J Jackson	6	1	1
(United States) J Craybas	0	6	6
PR	(Slovakia) H Nagyová	6^{7}	6	6
(Italy) T Garbin	7^{9}	1	2
WC	(Japan) A Morita	4	4
4	(Russia) M Kirilenko	6	6
7	(Japan) S Asagoe	6	6
(Venezuela) M Vento-Kabchi	3	3
Q	(Sweden) S Arvidsson	1	6	6
Q	(France) S Brémond	6	3	0
(Austria) S Bammer	6	5	0^{r}
(Japan) R Fujiwara	0	7	0
(Japan) A Morigami	6	1	1
2	(Czech Republic) N Vaidišová	4	6	6

Second round
6	(Argentina) G Dulko	3	3
(United States) J Craybas	6	6
PR	(Slovakia) H Nagyová	4	2
4	(Russia) M Kirilenko	6	6
7	(Japan) S Asagoe	6	3	4
Q	(Sweden) S Arvidsson	2	6	6
(Japan) R Fujiwara	4	2
2	(Czech Republic) N Vaidišová	6	6

Quarterfinals
(United States) J Craybas	2	6	2
4	(Russia) M Kirilenko	6	4	6
Q	(Sweden) S Arvidsson	6	3	2
2	(Czech Republic) N Vaidišová	2	6	6

Semifinals
4	(Russia) M Kirilenko	4	2
2	(Czech Republic) N Vaidišová	6	6
