= 2008 AIG Japan Open Tennis Championships – Women's singles =

Women's singles
- 2008 AIG Japan Open Tennis Championships

Final
- Champion: (Denmark) Caroline Wozniacki
- Runner-up: (Estonia) Kaia Kanepi
- Score: 6–2, 3–6, 6–1

Details
- Draw: 32 (4 Q / 2 WC )
- Seeds: 8

Events
Singles	men	women
Doubles	men	women
← 2007 ·	Japan Open	· 2009 →

Virginie Razzano was the defending champion, but chose not to participate that year.

First-seeded Caroline Wozniacki won in the final 6–2, 3–6, 6–1, against fifth-seeded Kaia Kanepi.

== Seeds ==
1. (Denmark) Caroline Wozniacki (champion)
2. (Spain) Anabel Medina Garrigues (second round)
3. (China) Zheng Jie (first round)
4. (Russia) Maria Kirilenko (first round)
5. (Estonia) Kaia Kanepi (final)
6. (Israel) Shahar Pe'er (second round)
7. (Thailand) Tamarine Tanasugarn (quarterfinals)
8. (Canada) Aleksandra Wozniak (semifinals)

== Draw ==
=== Key ===
- Q = Qualifier
- WC = Wild card
- LL = Lucky loser
- Alt = Alternate
- ITF = ITF entry
- PR = Protected ranking
- SR = Special ranking
- SE = Special exempt
- JE = Junior exempt
- JR = Junior Accelerator Programme entrant
- CO = College Accelerator Programme entrant
- NG = Next Gen Accelerator Program entrant
- w/o = Walkover
- r = Retired
- d = Defaulted

=== Finals ===
Semifinals
1	(Denmark) Caroline Wozniacki	6	6
LL	(Slovakia) Jarmila Gajdošová	4	3
5	(Estonia) Kaia Kanepi	6	6
8	(Canada) Aleksandra Wozniak	4	4

Final
1	(Denmark) Caroline Wozniacki	6	3	6
5	(Estonia) Kaia Kanepi	2	6	1

=== Top half ===
First round
1	(Denmark) C Wozniacki	4	6	6
(Argentina) G Dulko	6	0	3
(New Zealand) M Erakovic	1	4
WC	(Japan) A Morita	6	6
(France) C Pin	6	7
(Spain) C Suárez Navarro	0	5
Q	(Canada) S Dubois	1	3
7	(Thailand) T Tanasugarn	6	6
4	(Russia) M Kirilenko	6	2	5
(Czech Republic) K Zakopalová	4	6	7
WC	(Japan) A Nakamura	4	5
(Poland) M Domachowska	6	7
(Italy) M Santangelo	4	6^{0}
LL	(Slovakia) J Gajdošová	6	7
(Japan) K Date-Krumm	3	1
6	(Israel) S Pe'er	6	6

Second round
1	(Denmark) C Wozniacki	6	6
WC	(Japan) A Morita	2	1
(France) C Pin	2	2
7	(Thailand) T Tanasugarn	6	6
(Czech Republic) K Zakopalová	6	6
(Poland) M Domachowska	3	0
LL	(Slovakia) J Gajdošová	5	6	7
6	(Israel) S Pe'er	7	1	6^{9}

Quarterfinals
1	(Denmark) C Wozniacki	6	6
7	(Thailand) T Tanasugarn	4	1
(Czech Republic) K Zakopalová	5	5
LL	(Slovakia) J Gajdošová	7	7

Semifinals
1	(Denmark) C Wozniacki	6	6
LL	(Slovakia) J Gajdošová	4	3

=== Bottom half ===
First round
5	(Estonia) K Kanepi	4	6	6
(Czech Republic) L Šafářová	6	3	4
(Czech Republic) I Benešová	4	6	3
(Belgium) Y Wickmayer	6	3	6
(Czech Republic) P Cetkovská	6^{6}	4
Q	(Japan) R Fujiwara	7_{7}	6
(Russia) A Pavlyuchenkova	6	6
3	(China) J Zheng	1	2
8	(Canada) A Wozniak	7	6^{2}	6
(United States) J Craybas	5	7	3
Q	(Japan) R Fuda	7	6
(France) P Parmentier	5	2
(Australia) S Stosur	6
Q	(United States) V King	2	r
(Chinese Taipei) Y-j Chan	6	3	3
2	(Spain) A Medina Garrigues	3	6	6

Second round
5	(Estonia) K Kanepi	3	6	6
(Belgium) Y Wickmayer	6	1	0
Q	(Japan) R Fujiwara	2	2
(Russia) A Pavlyuchenkova	6	6
8	(Canada) A Wozniak	6	6
Q	(Japan) R Fuda	1	1
(Australia) S Stosur	6	7
2	(Spain) A Medina Garrigues	1	5

Quarterfinals
5	(Estonia) K Kanepi	7^{7}	7^{7}
(Russia) A Pavlyuchenkova	6^{4}	6^{1}
8	(Canada) A Wozniak	7	6
(Australia) S Stosur	5	3

Semifinals
5	(Estonia) K Kanepi	6	6
8	(Canada) A Wozniak	4	4
