= 2007 AIG Japan Open Tennis Championships – Women's singles =

Women's singles
- 2007 AIG Japan Open Tennis Championships

Final
- Champion: (France) Virginie Razzano
- Runner-up: (United States) Venus Williams
- Score: 4–6, 7–6^{(9–7)}, 6–4

Details
- Draw: 32 (4 Q / 2 WC )
- Seeds: 8

Events
Singles	men	women
Doubles	men	women
← 2006 ·	Japan Open	· 2008 →

Marion Bartoli was the defending champion, but chose not to participate that year.

Fifth-seeded Virginie Razzano won in the final 4–6, 7–6^{(9–7)}, 6–4, against first-seeded Venus Williams.

== Seeds ==
1. (United States) Venus Williams (final)
2. (India) Sania Mirza (quarterfinals)
3. (Russia) Maria Kirilenko (first round)
4. (Japan) Ai Sugiyama (first round)
5. (France) Virginie Razzano (champion)
6. (Japan) Akiko Morigami (first round)
7. (Japan) Aiko Nakamura (first round)
8. (Italy) Flavia Pennetta (semifinals)

== Draw ==
=== Key ===
- Q = Qualifier
- WC = Wild card
- LL = Lucky loser
- Alt = Alternate
- ITF = ITF entry
- PR = Protected ranking
- SR = Special ranking
- SE = Special exempt
- JE = Junior exempt
- JR = Junior Accelerator Programme entrant
- CO = College Accelerator Programme entrant
- NG = Next Gen Accelerator Program entrant
- w/o = Walkover
- r = Retired
- d = Defaulted

=== Finals ===
Semifinals
1	(United States) Venus Williams	6	7
(Denmark) Caroline Wozniacki	3	5
5	(France) Virginie Razzano	4	7	6
8	(Italy) Flavia Pennetta	6	5	3

Final
1	(United States) Venus Williams	6	6^{7}	4
5	(France) Virginie Razzano	4	7	6

=== Top half ===
First round
1	(United States) V Williams	6	6
(United States) J Craybas	3	1
(Romania) E Gallovits	2	7	5
(United States) V King	6	5	7
(Canada) A Wozniak	7	6^{7}	6
(France) Y Fedossova	5	7	1
(Australia) A Molik	6	6
6	(Japan) A Morigami	1	2
4	(Japan) A Sugiyama	3	3
Q	(China) M Yuan	6	6
(Denmark) C Wozniacki	6	6
(Colombia) C Castaño	2	1
WC	(Poland) U Radwańska	6	6
(Australia) S Ferguson	1	2
(Czech Republic) K Zakopalová	6	6
7	(Japan) A Nakamura	3	4

Second round
1	(United States) V Williams	6	6
(United States) V King	0	4
(Canada) A Wozniak	1	0
(Australia) A Molik	6	6
Q	(China) M Yuan	6^{3}	6	1
(Denmark) C Wozniacki	7	4	6
WC	(Poland) U Radwańska	2	6	2
(Czech Republic) K Zakopalová	6	3	6

Quarterfinals
1	(United States) V Williams	7	6
(Australia) A Molik	6^{4}	3
(Denmark) C Wozniacki	6	2	7
(Czech Republic) K Zakopalová	3	6	6^{3}

Semifinals
1	(United States) V Williams	6	7
(Denmark) C Wozniacki	3	5

=== Bottom half ===
First round
5	(France) V Razzano	6	6
(Thailand) T Tanasugarn	3	1
(China) Z Yan	6	2	4
Q	(United Kingdom) E Baltacha	2	6	6
(Spain) L Domínguez Lino	4	4
(Croatia) J Kostanić Tošić	6	6
(France) C Pin	6	4	6
3	(Russia) M Kirilenko	3	6	3
8	(Italy) F Pennetta	7	6
(United States) A Rolle	5	1
Q	(United States) A Spears	6	6
Q	(Japan) T Yonemura	4	1
(France) S Brémond	4	0
(Australia) C Dellacqua	6	6
WC	(Japan) A Morita	0	4
2	(India) S Mirza	6	6

Second round
5	(France) V Razzano	6	6
Q	(United Kingdom) E Baltacha	2	2
(Croatia) J Kostanić Tošić	1	0
(France) C Pin	6	6
8	(Italy) F Pennetta	6	7
Q	(United States) A Spears	4	6^{2}
(Australia) C Dellacqua	4	6	4
2	(India) S Mirza	6	3	6

Quarterfinals
5	(France) V Razzano	6	6
(France) C Pin	2	2
8	(Italy) F Pennetta	6	6
2	(India) S Mirza	4	4

Semifinals
5	(France) V Razzano	4	7	6
8	(Italy) F Pennetta	6	5	3
