= 2006 AIG Japan Open Tennis Championships – Women's singles =

Women's singles
- 2006 AIG Japan Open Tennis Championships

Final
- Champion: (France) Marion Bartoli
- Runner-up: (Japan) Aiko Nakamura
- Score: 2–6, 6–2, 6–2

Details
- Draw: 32 (4 Q / 3 WC )
- Seeds: 8

Events
Singles	men	women
Doubles	men	women
← 2005 ·	Japan Open	· 2007 →

Nicole Vaidišová was the defending champion, but did not compete this year.

First-seeded Marion Bartoli won the title by defeating Aiko Nakamura 2–6, 6–2, 6–2 in the final.

== Seeds ==
1. (France) Marion Bartoli (champion)
2. (Japan) Ai Sugiyama (quarterfinals)
3. (Russia) Maria Kirilenko (first round)
4. (Spain) Anabel Medina Garrigues (second round, retired due to a left hamstring strain)
5. (Sweden) Sofia Arvidsson (first round)
6. (Argentina) Gisela Dulko (first round)
7. (Czech Republic) Lucie Šafářová (first round)
8. (United States) Meghann Shaughnessy (first round)

== Draw ==
=== Key ===
- Q = Qualifier
- WC = Wild card
- LL = Lucky loser
- Alt = Alternate
- ITF = ITF entry
- PR = Protected ranking
- SR = Special ranking
- SE = Special exempt
- JE = Junior exempt
- JR = Junior Accelerator Programme entrant
- CO = College Accelerator Programme entrant
- NG = Next Gen Accelerator Program entrant
- w/o = Walkover
- r = Retired
- d = Defaulted

=== Finals ===
Semifinals
1	(France) Marion Bartoli	6	6
Q	(France) Camille Pin	0	1
WC	(Japan) Aiko Nakamura	7^{7}	2	6
(Chinese Taipei) Chan Yung-jan	6^{3}	6	4

Final
1	(France) Marion Bartoli	2	6	6
WC	(Japan) Aiko Nakamura	6	2	2

=== Top half ===
First round
1	(France) M Bartoli	6	3	6
(United States) J Craybas	2	6	4
(Russia) V Dushevina	7^{7}	6
Q	(India) S Uberoi	6^{3}	3
(Colombia) C Castaño	2	6	4
Q	(Japan) J Namigata	6	1	6
(Argentina) P Suárez	6	6
7	(Czech Republic) L Šafářová	4	4
3	(Russia) M Kirilenko	6	2	6^{3}
WC	(Japan) A Morigami	1	6	7^{7}
LL	(France) Y Fedossova	6	6
(Spain) V Ruano Pascual	1	2
(Greece) E Daniilidou	1	1^{r}
Q	(France) C Pin	6	1
Q	(United States) L Osterloh	6	3	6
8	(United States) M Shaughnessy	2	6	3

Second round
1	(France) M Bartoli	6	6
(Russia) V Dushevina	2	4
Q	(Japan) J Namigata	2
(Argentina) P Suárez	4^{r}
WC	(Japan) A Morigami	6	5	3
LL	(France) Y Fedossova	4	7	6
Q	(France) C Pin	6	3	6
Q	(United States) L Osterloh	4	6	0

Quarterfinals
1	(France) M Bartoli	6	6
Q	(Japan) J Namigata	2	1
LL	(France) Y Fedossova	7	4	1
Q	(France) C Pin	5	6	6

Semifinals
1	(France) M Bartoli	6	6
Q	(France) C Pin	0	1

=== Bottom half ===
First round
6	(Argentina) G Dulko	4	1
(United States) J Jackson	6	6
(Australia) A Molik	7	6
(Croatia) J Kostanić	5	3
WC	(Japan) A Nakamura	6	6
WC	(Denmark) C Wozniacki	3	3
(Czech Republic) K Zakopalová	6^{3}	5
4	(Spain) A Medina Garrigues	7^{7}	7
5	(Sweden) S Arvidsson	6^{4}	6^{1}
(Poland) M Domachowska	7^{7}	7^{7}
(Germany) J Schruff	3	0
(Chinese Taipei) Y-j Chan	6	6
(France) S Brémond	4	3
(United States) V King	6	6
(Finland) E Laine	4	3
2	(Japan) A Sugiyama	6	6

Second round
(United States) J Jackson	6	6
(Australia) A Molik	3	1
WC	(Japan) A Nakamura	5
4	(Spain) A Medina Garrigues	2^{r}
(Poland) M Domachowska	1	0
(Chinese Taipei) Y-j Chan	6	6
(United States) V King	4	7	5
2	(Japan) A Sugiyama	6	5	7

Quarterfinals
(United States) J Jackson	1	6	6^{4}
WC	(Japan) A Nakamura	6	1	7^{7}
(Chinese Taipei) Y-j Chan	6	6
2	(Japan) A Sugiyama	3	4

Semifinals
WC	(Japan) A Nakamura	7^{7}	2	6
(Chinese Taipei) Y-j Chan	6^{3}	6	4
