= 2008 AIG Japan Open Tennis Championships =

- Date: September 29 – October 5
- Edition: 35th
- Surface: Hard / outdoor
- Location: Tokyo, Japan
- Venue: Ariake Coliseum

Champions

Men's singles
- (Czech Republic) Tomáš Berdych

Women's singles
- (Denmark) Caroline Wozniacki

Men's doubles
- (Russia) Mikhail Youzhny / (Germany) Mischa Zverev

Women's doubles
- (United States) Jill Craybas / (New Zealand) Marina Erakovic
← 2007 ·	Japan Open	· 2009 →

The 2008 AIG Japan Open Tennis Championships was a combined men's and women's tennis tournament played on outdoor hard courts. It was the 35th edition of the event known that year as the AIG Japan Open Tennis Championships, and was part of the International Series Gold of the 2008 ATP Tour, and of the Tier III Series of the 2008 WTA Tour. Both the men's and the women's events took place at the Ariake Coliseum in Tokyo, Japan, from September 29 through October 5, 2008.

The men's field was led by ATP No. 5, Valencia and 's-Hertogenbosch winner, Tokyo defending champion David Ferrer, Dubai, San Jose and Beijing champion Andy Roddick, and Olympic silver medalist, Viña del Mar, Munich titlist Fernando González. Also present were Stuttgart finalist Richard Gasquet, Stuttgart, Kitzbühel, Los Angeles, Washington winner Juan Martín del Potro, Tommy Robredo, Jo-Wilfried Tsonga and Mikhail Youzhny.

The women's line up included Stockholm and New Haven champion Caroline Wozniacki, Fes and Portorož runner-up, Strasbourg winner Anabel Medina Garrigues, and Wimbledon semifinalist Jie Zheng. Other seeded players were Estoril, Barcelona and Seoul titlist Maria Kirilenko, French Open quarterfinalist Kaia Kanepi, Shahar Pe'er, Tamarine Tanasugarn and Aleksandra Wozniak.

== Finals ==
=== Men's singles ===
(Czech Republic) Tomáš Berdych defeated (Argentina) Juan Martín del Potro, 6–1, 6–4

- It was Tomáš Berdych's 1st title of the year, and his 4th overall.

=== Women's singles ===
(Denmark) Caroline Wozniacki defeated (Estonia) Kaia Kanepi, 6–2, 3–6, 6–1

- It was Caroline Wozniacki's 3rd title of the year, and overall.

=== Men's doubles ===
(Russia) Mikhail Youzhny / (Germany) Mischa Zverev defeated (Czech Republic) Lukáš Dlouhý / (India) Leander Paes, 6–3, 6–4

=== Women's doubles ===
(United States) Jill Craybas / (New Zealand) Marina Erakovic defeated (Japan) Ayumi Morita / (Japan) Aiko Nakamura, 4–6, 7–5, [10–6]
