= 2007 AIG Japan Open Tennis Championships – Women's doubles =

Women's doubles
- 2007 AIG Japan Open Tennis Championships

Final
- Champions: (China) Sun Tiantian (China) Yan Zi
- Runners-up: (Chinese Taipei) Chia-jung Chuang (United States) Vania King
- Score: 1–6, 6–2, 10–6

Details
- Draw: 16 (1WC)
- Seeds: 4

Events
Singles	men	women
Doubles	men	women
- AIG Japan Open Tennis Championships

Vania King and Jelena Kostanić were the defending champions. They were both present but did not compete together.
Kostanic partnered with Jill Craybas, but lost in the first round to Camille Pin and María Emilia Salerni.
King partnered with Chia-jung Chuang, but Sun Tiantian and Yan Zi defeated them 1–6, 6–2, 10–6, in the final.

== Seeds ==
1. (Chinese Taipei) Chia-jung Chuang / (United States) Vania King (final)
2. (China) Sun Tiantian / (China) Yan Zi (champions)
3. (United States) Jill Craybas / (Croatia) Jelena Kostanić Tošić (first round)
4. (Spain) Lourdes Domínguez Lino / (Spain) Arantxa Parra Santonja (first round)

== Draw ==
Key

- Q = Qualifier
- WC = Wild card
- LL = Lucky loser
- Alt = Alternate
- ITF = ITF entry
- PR = Protected ranking
- SR = Special ranking
- SE = Special exempt
- JE = Junior exempt
- JR = Junior Accelerator Programme entrant
- CO = College Accelerator Programme entrant
- NG = Next Gen Accelerator Program entrant
- w/o = Walkover
- r = Retired
- d = Defaulted

First round
1	(Chinese Taipei) C-j Chuang (United States) V King	6	7
(Japan) A Morita (Japan) A Sugiyama	3	6^{3}
(Australia) C Dellacqua (South Africa) N Grandin	6	6
(Italy) F Pennetta (Denmark) C Wozniacki	1	3
3	(United States) J Craybas (Croatia) J Kostanić Tošić	6^{4}	1
(France) C Pin (Argentina) ME Salerni	7	6
WC	(Japan) M Arai (Japan) T Yonemura	4	2
(Japan) A Nakamura (Thailand) T Tanasugarn	6	6
(Japan) K Iijima (Japan) S Okamoto	6	3	[5]
(Australia) S Ferguson (Japan) A Yonemura	0	6	[10]
(Colombia) C Castaño (United States) A Spears	6	6
4	(Spain) L Domínguez Lino (Spain) A Parra Santonja	4	3
(Poland) U Radwańska (Romania) A Szatmári	3	2
(United States) C Fusano (India) S Mirza	6	6
(Japan) R Fujiwara (Japan) J Namigata	3	2
2	(China) T Sun (China) Z Yan	6	6

Quarterfinals
1	(Chinese Taipei) C-j Chuang (United States) V King	6	6
(Australia) C Dellacqua (South Africa) N Grandin	3	2
(France) C Pin (Argentina) ME Salerni	6^{4}	1
(Japan) A Nakamura (Thailand) T Tanasugarn	7	6
(Australia) S Ferguson (Japan) A Yonemura	6^{3}	7	[10]
(Colombia) C Castaño (United States) A Spears	7	5	[4]
(United States) C Fusano (India) S Mirza
2	(China) T Sun (China) Z Yan	w/o

Semifinals
1	(Chinese Taipei) C-j Chuang (United States) V King	6	6
(Japan) A Nakamura (Thailand) T Tanasugarn	3	3
(Australia) S Ferguson (Japan) A Yonemura	3	4
2	(China) T Sun (China) Z Yan	6	6

Final
1	(Chinese Taipei) C-j Chuang (United States) V King	6	2	[6]
2	(China) T Sun (China) Z Yan	1	6	[10]
