= 2005 AIG Japan Open Tennis Championships – Men's doubles =

Men's doubles
- 2005 AIG Japan Open Tennis Championships

Final
- Champions: (Japan) Satoshi Iwabuchi (Japan) Takao Suzuki
- Runners-up: (Sweden) Simon Aspelin (Australia) Todd Perry
- Score: 5–4^{(7–3)}, 5–4^{(15–13)}

Details
- Draw: 16 (2WC)
- Seeds: 4

Events
Singles	men	women
Doubles	men	women
- Japan Open

Jared Palmer and Pavel Vízner were the defending champions, but they chose not to participate.

Satoshi Iwabuchi and Takao Suzuki won the title by defeating Simon Aspelin and Todd Perry 5–4^{(7–3)}, 5–4^{(15–13)} in the final.

== Seeds ==
1. (Australia) Wayne Arthurs / (Australia) Paul Hanley (semifinals)
2. (Sweden) Simon Aspelin / (Australia) Todd Perry (final)
3. (Argentina) Gastón Etlis / (Argentina) Martín Rodríguez (quarterfinals)
4. (Australia) Stephen Huss / (South Africa) Wesley Moodie (first round)

== Draw ==
Key

- Q = Qualifier
- WC = Wild card
- LL = Lucky loser
- Alt = Alternate
- ITF = ITF entry
- PR = Protected ranking
- SR = Special ranking
- SE = Special exempt
- JE = Junior exempt
- JR = Junior Accelerator Programme entrant
- CO = College Accelerator Programme entrant
- NG = Next Gen Accelerator Program entrant
- w/o = Walkover
- r = Retired
- d = Defaulted

=== Draw ===
First round
1	(Australia) W Arthurs (Australia) P Hanley	2	5	5
WC	(Japan) G Motomura (Japan) G Soeda	5	2	2
(Australia) J Kerr (United States) T Parrott	1
(Germany) R Schüttler (Germany) A Waske	1^{r}
3	(Argentina) G Etlis (Argentina) M Rodríguez	5	3	5
(Peru) L Horna (Ecuador) N Lapentti	3	5	2
(Switzerland) Y Allegro (United States) G Oliver	4^{2}	2
WC	(Japan) S Iwabuchi (Japan) T Suzuki	5^{7}	5
(Argentina) J Mónaco (Luxembourg) G Müller	5	5
(United States) J Thomas (Netherlands) R Wassen	3	2
(Czech Republic) I Minář (Czech Republic) R Vik	5	2	5
4	(Australia) S Huss (South Africa) W Moodie	2	5	2
(Czech Republic) J Levinský (Czech Republic) R Štěpánek	5^{7}	1	3
(India) M Bhupathi (United States) J Gimelstob	4^{4}	5	5
(United States) T Dent (United States) JM Gambill	4^{4}	2
2	(Sweden) S Aspelin (Australia) T Perry	5^{7}	5

Quarterfinals
1	(Australia) W Arthurs (Australia) P Hanley	5^{10}	5
(Australia) J Kerr (United States) T Parrott	4^{8}	2
3	(Argentina) G Etlis (Argentina) M Rodríguez	4^{4}	2
WC	(Japan) S Iwabuchi (Japan) T Suzuki	5^{7}	5
(Argentina) J Mónaco (Luxembourg) G Müller	w/o
(Czech Republic) I Minář (Czech Republic) R Vik
(India) M Bhupathi (United States) J Gimelstob	0	4^{4}
2	(Sweden) S Aspelin (Australia) T Perry	5	5^{7}

Semifinals
1	(Australia) W Arthurs (Australia) P Hanley	5^{7}	2	4^{3}
WC	(Japan) S Iwabuchi (Japan) T Suzuki	4^{5}	5	5^{7}
(Argentina) J Mónaco (Luxembourg) G Müller	5	4^{3}	2
2	(Sweden) S Aspelin (Australia) T Perry	1	5^{7}	5

Final
WC	(Japan) S Iwabuchi (Japan) T Suzuki	5^{7}	5^{15}
2	(Sweden) S Aspelin (Australia) T Perry	4^{3}	4^{13}
