= 2009 Shimadzu All Japan Indoor Tennis Championships – Singles =

Singles
- 2009 Shimadzu All Japan Indoor Tennis Championships

Final
- Champion: (Ukraine) Sergei Bubka
- Runner-up: (Japan) Takao Suzuki
- Score: 7–6(6), 6–4

Events
Singles	Doubles
← 2008 ·	Shimadzu All Japan Indoor Tennis Championships	· 2010 →

Sergei Bubka won in the final 7–6(6), 6–4, against Takao Suzuki.

== Seeds ==
1. (Japan) Go Soeda (first round)
2. (South Korea) Lee Hyung-taik (first round)
3. (Australia) Chris Guccione (first round)
4. (India) Prakash Amritraj (first round)
5. (Germany) Dieter Kindlmann (second round)
6. (Germany) Matthias Bachinger (quarterfinals)
7. (Australia) Colin Ebelthite (first round)
8. (Austria) Martin Slanar (first round)

== Draw ==
=== Key ===
- Q = Qualifier
- WC = Wild card
- LL = Lucky loser
- Alt = Alternate
- SE = Special exempt
- PR = Protected ranking
- ITF = ITF entry
- JE = Junior exempt
- w/o = Walkover
- r = Retired
- d = Defaulted
- SR = Special ranking

=== Final four ===
Semifinals
WC	(Japan) Takao Suzuki	6	6
(Croatia) Ivan Dodig	4	4
(Ukraine) Sergei Bubka	6	7
(Japan) Tatsuma Ito	3	6^{3}

Final
WC	(Japan) Takao Suzuki	6^{6}	4
(Ukraine) Sergei Bubka	7	6

=== Top half ===
First round
1	(Japan) G Soeda	6	6^{5}	3
Q	(France) B Dupuy	1	7	6
WC	(Japan) H Moriya	6	7
(Japan) Y Sugita	4	5
WC	(Japan) T Suzuki	6	3	6
(United States) A Kuznetsov	4	6	4
(Slovakia) I Klec	7	6
7	(Australia) C Ebelthite	6^{5}	3
3	(Australia) C Guccione	6^{3}	4
(Pakistan) A-u-H Qureshi	7	6
(Croatia) I Dodig	6	6
(United States) T Smyczek	3	4
Q	(United States) E Nunez	3	6^{4}
(Chinese Taipei) T Chen	6	7
(South Africa) R Klaasen	3	6^{1}
6	(Germany) M Bachinger	6	7

Second round
Q	(France) B Dupuy	3	0	r
WC	(Japan) H Moriya	6	1
WC	(Japan) T Suzuki	3	6	6
(Slovakia) I Klec	6	3	3
(Pakistan) A-u-H Qureshi	5	1
(Croatia) I Dodig	7	6
(Chinese Taipei) T Chen	1	2
6	(Germany) M Bachinger	6	6

Quarterfinals
WC	(Japan) H Moriya	5	2
WC	(Japan) T Suzuki	7	6
(Croatia) I Dodig	6	6
6	(Germany) M Bachinger	4	4

Semifinals
WC	(Japan) T Suzuki	6	6
(Croatia) I Dodig	4	4

=== Bottom half ===
First round
8	(Austria) M Slanar	3	4
(Ukraine) S Bubka	6	6
WC	(Lithuania) R Berankis	4	5
(Spain) G Alcaide	6	7
(South Korea) KT Im	7	5	4
(South Africa) I van der Merwe	6^{1}	7	6
(Japan) Junn Mitsuhashi	7	6^{4}	6
4	(India) P Amritraj	6^{5}	7	3
5	(Germany) D Kindlmann	6	7
(South Africa) F Wolmarans	4	6^{5}
(United Kingdom) A Slabinsky	6^{6}	6	3
Q	(Japan) T Matsui	7	3	6
WC	(Japan) G Motomura	4	6^{5}
(Japan) T Iwami	6	7
(Japan) T Ito	6	6
2	(South Korea) H-t Lee	3	1

Second round
(Ukraine) S Bubka	2	6	6
(Spain) G Alcaide	6	3	2
(South Africa) I van der Merwe	4	4
(Japan) J Mitsuhashi	6	6
5	(Germany) D Kindlmann	6	6^{2}	5
Q	(Japan) T Matsui	4	7	7
(Japan) T Iwami	6^{2}	3
(Japan) T Ito	7	6

Quarterfinals
(Ukraine) S Bubka	7	4	7
(Japan) J Mitsuhashi	6^{5}	6	6^{4}
Q	(Japan) T Matsui	4	5
(Japan) T Ito	6	7

Semifinals
(Ukraine) S Bubka	6	7
(Japan) T Ito	3	6^{3}
