= 2005 AIG Japan Open Tennis Championships =

- Date: 3–9 October
- Edition: 32nd
- Surface: Hard / outdoor
- Location: Tokyo, Japan
- Venue: Ariake Coliseum

Champions

Men's singles
- (South Africa) Wesley Moodie

Women's singles
- (Czech Republic) Nicole Vaidišová

Men's doubles
- (Japan) Satoshi Iwabuchi / (Japan) Takao Suzuki

Women's doubles
- (Argentina) Gisela Dulko / (Russia) Maria Kirilenko
- Japan Open

The 2005 AIG Japan Open Tennis Championships was a tennis tournament played on outdoor hard courts. It was the 32nd edition of the event known that year as the AIG Japan Open Tennis Championships, and was part of the International Series Gold of the 2005 ATP Tour, and of the Tier III Series of the 2005 WTA Tour. Both the men's and the women's events took place at the Ariake Coliseum in Tokyo, Japan, from 3 October through 9 October 2005. Wesley Moodie and Nicole Vaidišová won the singles titles.

== Finals ==
=== Men's singles ===
(South Africa) Wesley Moodie defeated (Croatia) Mario Ančić, 1–6, 7–6^{(9–7)}, 6–4

- It was Moodie's 1st title of the year and the 1st of his career.

=== Women's singles ===
(Czech Republic) Nicole Vaidišová defeated (France) Tatiana Golovin, 7–6^{(7–4)}, 3–2, retired

- It was Vaidišová's 2nd title of the year and the 4th of her career.

=== Men's doubles ===
(Japan) Satoshi Iwabuchi / (Japan) Takao Suzuki defeated (Sweden) Simon Aspelin / (Australia) Todd Perry, 5–4^{(7–3)}, 5–4^{(15–13)}

- It was the first and only title for both Iwabuchi and Suzuki.

=== Women's doubles ===
(Argentina) Gisela Dulko / (Russia) Maria Kirilenko defeated (Japan) Shinobu Asagoe / (Venezuela) María Vento-Kabchi, 7–5, 4–6, 6–3
