= 2010 Rakuten Japan Open Tennis Championships =

- Date: 4–10 October
- Edition: 37th
- Category: ATP World Tour 500
- Surface: Hard / outdoor
- Location: Tokyo, Japan
- Venue: Ariake Coliseum

Champions

Singles
- (Spain) Rafael Nadal

Doubles
- (United States) Eric Butorac / (Netherlands Antilles) Jean-Julien Rojer
- Japan Open

The 2010 Rakuten Japan Open Tennis Championships was a men's tennis tournament played on outdoor hard courts. It was the 37th edition of the event known that year as the Rakuten Japan Open Tennis Championships, and was part of the 500 Series of the 2010 ATP World Tour. It was held at the Ariake Coliseum in Tokyo, Japan, from October 4 through October 11, 2010. First-seeded Rafael Nadal won the singles title.

== ATP entrants ==
=== Seeds ===
| Country | Player | Rank^{1} | Seed |
|---|---|---|---|
| ESP | Rafael Nadal | 1 | 1 |
| USA | Andy Roddick | 10 | 2 |
| FRA | Jo-Wilfried Tsonga | 12 | 3 |
| AUT | Jürgen Melzer | 13 | 4 |
| FRA | Gaël Monfils | 15 | 5 |
| ESP | Feliciano López | 23 | 6 |
| LAT | Ernests Gulbis | 25 | 7 |
| FRA | Michaël Llodra | 28 | 8 |

- Rankings are based on the rankings of September 27, 2010.

=== Other entrants ===
The following players received wildcards into the singles main draw:

- (Japan) Tatsuma Ito
- (Japan) Kei Nishikori
- (Japan) Go Soeda

The following players received entry from the qualifying draw:

- (Croatia) Ivan Dodig
- (United States) Rajeev Ram
- (Canada) Milos Raonic
- (France) Édouard Roger-Vasselin

== Finals ==
=== Singles ===
(Spain) Rafael Nadal defeated (France) Gaël Monfils, 6–1, 7–5

- It was Nadal's 7th title of the year and 43rd of his career.

=== Doubles ===
(United States) Eric Butorac / (Netherlands Antilles) Jean-Julien Rojer defeated (Italy) Andreas Seppi / (Russia) Dmitry Tursunov, 6–3, 6–2.
