= Takao Suzuki =

Japanese tennis player (born 1976)

Takao Suzuki 鈴木貴男
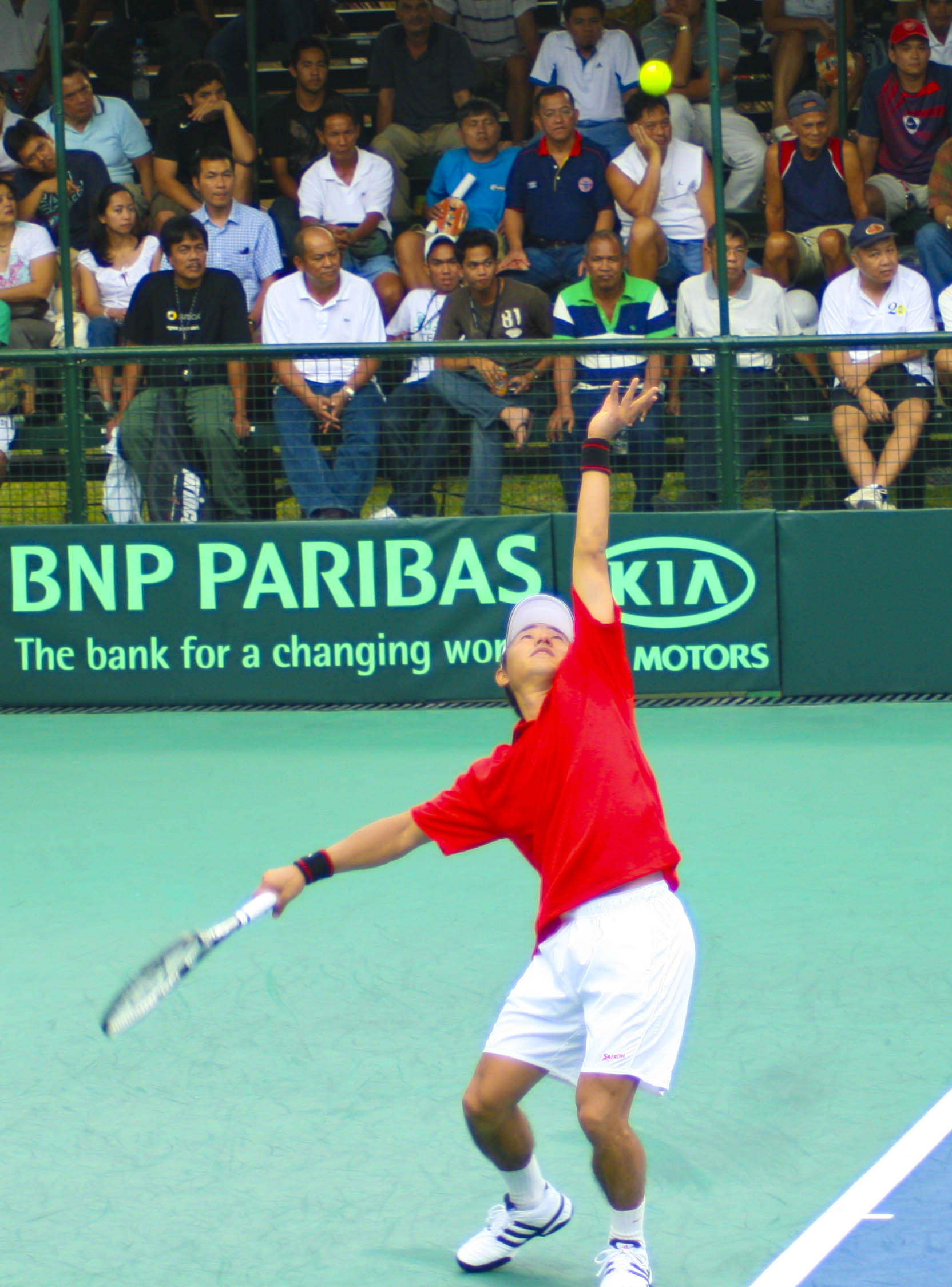
- Country (sports): Japan
- Residence: Tokyo, Japan
- Born: 20 September 1976 (age 48); Sapporo, Japan
- Height: 1.75 m (5 ft 9 in)
- Turned pro: 1995
- Retired: 2018
- Plays: Right-handed (one-handed backhand)
- Prize money: $729,355

Singles
- Career record: 50–46
- Career titles: 0
- Highest ranking: No. 102 (23 November 1998)

Grand Slam singles results
- Australian Open: 2R (2005)
- French Open: Q3 (1998, 2002)
- Wimbledon: 2R (2003)
- US Open: 1R (1999, 2004)

Doubles
- Career record: 31–37
- Career titles: 1
- Highest ranking: No. 119 (7 November 2005)

Grand Slam doubles results
- Australian Open: 3R (2005)
- Wimbledon: Q1 (1998)
- US Open: Q1 (1998)

Other doubles tournaments
- Olympic Games: 2R (1996)
Medal record
Tennis
Representing Japan
Asian Games
Gold medal – first place	2002 Busan	Team event
Silver medal – second place	2006 Doha	Team event
Bronze medal – third place	2002 Busan	Men's singles
Bronze medal – third place	2010 Guangzhou	Team event
- Last updated on: 25 October 2021.

Takao Suzuki (鈴木 貴男, Suzuki Takao; born 20 September 1976) is a professional tennis player and a former Japanese No. 1.

== Tennis career ==
Suzuki reached a career-high singles ranking of World No. 102 in 1998 and has earned nearly three quarters of a million dollars in prize winnings on the ATP Tour. He is well known for his outstanding performances against Roger Federer at the Australian Open in 2005 and the 2006 Tokyo Open.

In 2006, Suzuki injured his shoulder at the Australian Open qualifying tournament in a match against Paul Capdeville and sat out most of the season as a result. He briefly returned to competitive tennis in May in a challenger tournament in South Korea and lost in the quarter finals. In October 2006, Suzuki played in his first International Series event of the year, the Japan Open Tennis Championships held in Tokyo, having received a wildcard into the main draw. Suzuki, ranked World No. 1078 at the time, won surprise victories over 8th seed Paradorn Srichaphan and World No. 126 Alexander Waske en route to his quarter finals berth against Federer. Suzuki once again lost to Federer in three sets, 6–4, 5–7, 6–7^{(3)}.

== ATP career finals ==
=== Doubles: 1 (1 title) ===
Legend Grand Slam tournaments (0–0) ATP World Tour Finals (0–0) ATP Masters Series (0–0) ATP International Series Gold (1–0) ATP International Series (0–0)	Titles by surface Hard (1–0) Clay (0–0) Grass (0–0) Carpet (0-0)	Titles by setting Outdoor (1–0) Indoor (0–0)

Result	W–L	Date	Tournament	Tier	Surface	Partner	Opponents	Score
Win	1–0	Oct 2005	Tokyo, Japan	International Series Gold	Hard	(Japan) Satoshi Iwabuchi	(Sweden) Simon Aspelin (Australia) Todd Perry	5–4^{(7–3)}, 5–4^{(15–13)}

== Performance timelines ==
Key
W	F	SF	QF	#R	RR	Q#	DNQ	A	NH

(W) winner; (F) finalist; (SF) semifinalist; (QF) quarterfinalist; (#R) rounds 4, 3, 2, 1; (RR) round-robin stage; (Q#) qualification round; (DNQ) did not qualify; (A) absent; (NH) not held; (SR) strike rate (events won / competed); (W–L) win–loss record.

=== Singles ===
Tournament	1996	1997	1998	1999	2000	2001	2002	2003	2004	2005	2006	2007	2008	2009	2010	SR	W–L	Win %
Grand Slam tournaments
Australian Open	Q2	A	Q2	1R	Q1	1R	Q1	Q2	Q2	2R	Q1	A	Q1	A	Q3	0 / 3	1–3	25%
French Open	A	A	Q3	Q2	A	A	Q3	Q2	Q1	Q1	A	A	A	A	A	0 / 0	0–0	–
Wimbledon	A	A	Q1	1R	A	Q2	Q1	2R	Q3	Q1	A	Q2	A	A	A	0 / 2	1–2	33%
US Open	A	A	Q2	1R	Q3	Q1	Q2	Q3	1R	Q1	A	Q1	A	A	A	0 / 2	0–2	0%
Win–loss	0–0	0–0	0–0	0–3	0–0	0–1	0–0	1–1	0–1	1–1	0–0	0–0	0–0	0–0	0–0	0 / 7	2–7	22%
ATP Masters Series
Indian Wells	A	A	A	Q1	A	A	A	A	A	A	A	A	A	A	A	0 / 0	0–0	–
Miami	A	A	A	Q1	A	A	A	A	A	Q2	A	A	A	A	A	0 / 0	0–0	–
Hamburg	A	A	A	A	A	A	A	A	A	Q1	A	A	A	A	A	0 / 0	0–0	–
Rome	A	A	A	Q1	A	A	A	A	A	A	A	A	A	A	A	0 / 0	0–0	–
Canada	Q1	A	A	A	A	A	A	A	A	Q2	A	A	A	A	A	0 / 0	0–0	–
Win–loss	0–0	0–0	0–0	0–0	0–0	0–0	0–0	0–0	0–0	0–0	0–0	0–0	0–0	0–0	0–0	0 / 0	0–0	–

== ATP Challenger and ITF Futures finals ==
=== Singles: 22 (17–5) ===
Legend ATP Challenger (16–3) ITF Futures (1–2)	Finals by surface Hard (14–4) Clay (0–0) Grass (0–0) Carpet (3–1)

Result	W–L	Date	Tournament	Tier	Surface	Opponent	Score
Win	1–0	Nov 1997	Bombay, India	Challenger	Hard	(United Kingdom) Barry Cowan	6–1, 6–0
Win	2–0	Jul 1998	Denver, United States	Challenger	Hard	(South Africa) Justin Bower	6–3, 4–6, 6–4
Win	3–0	Jul 1998	Granby, Canada	Challenger	Hard	(United States) David Caldwell	7–6, 6–3
Loss	3–1	Jul 1998	Aptos, United States	Challenger	Hard	(United States) Cecil Mamiit	7–6, 3–6, 2–6
Win	4–1	Aug 1998	Binghamton, United States	Challenger	Hard	(Italy) Diego Nargiso	5–2 ret.
Win	5–1	Jul 2000	Granby, Canada	Challenger	Hard	(United States) Cecil Mamiit	6–4, 6–3
Win	6–1	Jul 2000	Winnetka, United States	Challenger	Hard	(South Korea) Yoon Yong-il	6–2, 6–4
Win	7–1	Aug 2000	Lexington, United States	Challenger	Hard	(United States) Justin Gimelstob	2–1 ret.
Win	8–1	Aug 2000	Binghamton, United States	Challenger	Hard	(South Korea) Yoon Yong-il	6–1, 6–4
Win	9–1	Nov 2001	Yokohama, Japan	Challenger	Carpet	(Japan) Gouichi Motomura	6–2, 6–7^{(5–7)}, 7–6^{(7–4)}
Win	10–1	Mar 2002	Ho Chi Minh City, Vietnam	Challenger	Hard	(Croatia) Mario Ančić	6–4, 6–3
Win	11–1	Mar 2002	Kyoto, Japan	Challenger	Carpet	(Croatia) Mario Ančić	6–7^{(4–7)}, 6–2, 6–2
Win	12–1	Mar 2002	Osaka, Japan	Challenger	Hard	(Germany) Björn Phau	5–7, 6–2, 7–6^{(7–4)}
Win	13–1	Jul 2004	Campos do Jordão, Brazil	Challenger	Hard	(Ecuador) Giovanni Lapentti	6–4, 6–3
Win	14–1	Mar 2007	Kyoto, Japan	Challenger	Carpet	(Germany) Dieter Kindlmann	2–6, 7–5, 6–1
Win	15–1	Jul 2007	Granby, Canada	Challenger	Hard	(Chinese Taipei) Lu Yen-hsun	6–4, 6–4
Loss	15–2	Nov 2007	Yokohama, Japan	Challenger	Hard	(Israel) Dudi Sela	7–6^{(7–5)}, 4–6, 2–6
Loss	15–3	Mar 2009	Kyoto, Japan	Challenger	Carpet	(Ukraine) Sergey Bubka	6–7^{(6–8)}, 4–6
Win	16–3	Nov 2009	Yokohama, Japan	Challenger	Hard	(Austria) Martin Fischer	6–4, 7–6^{(7–5)}
Loss	16–4	Jul 2013	Japan F8, Kashiwa	Futures	Hard	(Japan) Hiroki Kondo	3–6, 5–7
Win	17–4	May 2015	Guam F1, Tumon	Futures	Hard	(Japan) Gengo Kikuchi	6–3, 6–3
Loss	17–5	Jun 2017	Guam F1, Tumon	Futures	Hard	(Japan) Hiroyasu Ehara	6–7^{(4–7)}, 6–4, 3–6

=== Doubles: 24 (18–6) ===
Legend ATP Challenger (10–5) ITF Futures (8–1)	Finals by surface Hard (9–3) Clay (4–0) Grass (0–0) Carpet (5–3)

Result	W–L	Date	Tournament	Tier	Surface	Partner	Opponents	Score
Win	1–0	Apr 1996	Nagoya, Japan	Challenger	Hard	(Japan) Satoshi Iwabuchi	(Australia) Ben Ellwood (Australia) Peter Tramacchi	7–6, 7–6
Loss	1–1	Feb 1997	Kyoto, Japan	Challenger	Carpet	(Japan) Satoshi Iwabuchi	(India) Mahesh Bhupathi (Zimbabwe) Wayne Black	4–6, 7–6, 1–6
Loss	1–2	Sep 1997	Urbana, United States	Challenger	Hard	(Japan) Gouichi Motomura	(United States) Michael Sell (South Africa) Kevin Ullyett	6–3, 6–7, 2–6
Win	2–2	Mar 1998	Kyoto, Japan	Challenger	Carpet	(South Africa) Kevin Ullyett	(Mexico) Óscar Ortiz (Venezuela) Maurice Ruah	4–6, 6–1, 6–4
Win	3–2	Jul 1998	Granby, Canada	Challenger	Hard	(Japan) Gouichi Motomura	(Canada) Bobby Kokavec (Canada) Frédéric Niemeyer	7–6, 6–1
Win	4–2	Aug 1998	Bronx, United States	Challenger	Hard	(United States) Jared Palmer	(Czech Republic) Ota Fukárek (Romania) Gabriel Trifu	6–1, 6–2
Loss	4–3	Nov 1998	Portorož, Slovenia	Challenger	Hard	(North Macedonia) Aleksandar Kitinov	(Belarus) Max Mirnyi (Russia) Andrei Olhovskiy	4–6, 6–7
Win	5–3	Nov 1999	Aachen, Germany	Challenger	Carpet	(Germany) Lars Burgsmüller	(Spain) Juan Ignacio Carrasco (Spain) Jairo Velasco	7–6, 6–4
Win	6–3	Apr 2000	Japan F3, Isawa	Futures	Clay	(Japan) Takahiro Terachi	(Japan) Natsuki Harada (Japan) Hiroyasu Sato	6–4, 6–3
Win	7–3	Jun 2000	Italy F4, Pavia	Futures	Clay	(Italy) Igor Gaudi	(Italy) Filippo Messori (Italy) Davide Scala	6–4, 6–4
Win	8–3	Feb 2001	Ho Chi Minh City, Vietnam	Challenger	Hard	(United States) Eric Taino	(Italy) Filippo Messori (Italy) Vincenzo Santopadre	7–6^{(9–7)}, 2–6, 6–4
Win	9–3	Sep 2001	Japan F7, Chiba	Futures	Hard	(Japan) Hiroki Kondo	(United States) Doug Bohaboy (Japan) Toshiharu Kato	4–6, 6–4, 6–4
Win	10–3	Nov 2001	Ho Chi Minh City, Vietnam	Challenger	Carpet	(United States) Eric Taino	(Italy) Filippo Messori (Italy) Vincenzo Santopadre	7–6^{(9–7)}, 2–6, 6–4
Win	11–3	Nov 2001	Yokohama, Japan	Challenger	Carpet	(Japan) Mitsuru Takada	(Switzerland) Marco Chiudinelli (Germany) Sebastian Jaeger	6–3, 6–4
Win	12–3	Sep 2002	Japan F7, Saitama	Futures	Hard	(Japan) Michihisa Onoda	(United States) Doug Bohaboy (United States) Thomas Blake	6–3, 6–3
Loss	12–4	Nov 2002	Aachen, Germany	Challenger	Carpet	(Japan) Thomas Shimada	(United States) Jim Thomas (Belgium) Tom Vanhoudt	7–6^{(7–4)}, 6–7^{(4–7)}, 3–6
Win	13–4	Jul 2003	Lexington, United States	Challenger	Hard	(Israel) Jonathan Erlich	(United States) Matías Boeker (United States) Travis Parrott	6–4, 6–1
Win	14–4	Nov 2003	Milan, Italy	Challenger	Carpet	(Italy) Davide Sanguinetti	(Poland) Mariusz Fyrstenberg (Poland) Marcin Matkowski	6–4, 7–5
Loss	14–5	Mar 2009	Kyoto, Japan	Challenger	Carpet	(Japan) Tatsuma Ito	(Pakistan) Aisam Qureshi (Austria) Martin Slanar	7–6^{(9–7)}, 6–7^{(3–7)}, [6–10]
Win	15–5	Jul 2009	Japan F7, Sapporo	Futures	Clay	(Japan) Hiroki Kondo	(Japan) Yuichi Ito (Japan) Tatsuma Ito	6–3, 7–6^{(7–4)}
Win	16–5	Oct 2012	Japan F8, Kashiwa	Futures	Hard	(Japan) Sho Katayama	(New Zealand) Daniel King-Turner (New Zealand) José Statham	3–6, 6–3, [10–8]
Loss	16–6	Mar 2014	Japan F1, Tokyo	Futures	Hard	(Japan) Shintaro Imai	(Japan) Toshihide Matsui (Japan) Arata Onozawa	4–6, 5–7
Win	17–6	Jun 2014	Japan F8, Sapporo	Futures	Clay	(Japan) Yasutaka Uchiyama	(Japan) Takuto Niki (Japan) Arata Onozawa	6–2, 7–6^{(7–4)}
Win	18–6	Aug 2014	Chinese Taipei F1, Kaohsiung	Futures	Hard	(Japan) Arata Onozawa	(Chinese Taipei) Chen Ti (Chinese Taipei) Huang Liang-chi	7–6^{(7–3)}, 6–3
