= 1991 Suntory Japan Open Tennis Championships – Women's doubles =

Women's doubles
- 1991 Suntory Japan Open Tennis Championships

Final
- Champion: (United States) Amy Frazier; (Japan) Maya Kidowaki
- Runner-up: (Japan) Yone Kamio; (Japan) Akiko Kijimuta
- Score: 6–2, 6–4

Details
- Draw: 16 (1Q / 1WC)
- Seeds: 4

Events
Singles	men	women
Doubles	men	women
- Japan Open

Kathy Jordan and Elizabeth Smylie were the defending champions, but did not compete this year.

Amy Frazier and Maya Kidowaki won the title, defeating Yone Kamio and Akiko Kijimuta in the final, 6–2, 6–4.

== Seeds ==
1. (Belgium) Sabine Appelmans / (Australia) Nicole Provis (semifinals)
2. (Peru) Laura Gildemeister / (United States) Lori McNeil (semifinals)
3. (Australia) Jo-Anne Faull / (Australia) Louise Field (first round)
4. (United States) Amy Frazier / (Japan) Maya Kidowaki (champions)

== Draw ==
Key

- Q = Qualifier
- WC = Wild card
- LL = Lucky loser
- Alt = Alternate
- ITF = ITF entry
- PR = Protected ranking
- SR = Special ranking
- SE = Special exempt
- JE = Junior exempt
- JR = Junior Accelerator Programme entrant
- CO = College Accelerator Programme entrant
- NG = Next Gen Accelerator Program entrant
- w/o = Walkover
- r = Retired
- d = Defaulted

First round
1	(Belgium) S Appelmans (Australia) N Provis	6	6
(United Kingdom) M Javer (Peru) P Vásquez	2	1
(Australia) K Godridge (Australia) N Pratt	0	1
(Indonesia) Y Basuki (Indonesia) S Wibowo	6	6
4	(United States) A Frazier (Japan) M Kidowaki	7^{9}	7
(Luxembourg) K Kschwendt (Czechoslovakia) E Švíglerová	6^{7}	5
(Japan) E Iida (United States) A May	6	6
WC	(Japan) K Date (Japan) N Miyagi	1	0
(Mexico) L Novelo (United States) B Somerville	4	6	7^{7}
(Japan) Y Koizumi (Australia) A Minter	6	4	6^{4}
Q	(Japan) Y Kamio (Japan) A Kijimuta	6	6^{5}	7
3	(Australia) J-A Faull (Australia) L Field	2	7^{7}	5
(United States) J Smoller (United States) M Werdel	2	4
(United States) C Cunningham (Sweden) C Lindqvist	6	6
(Australia) K Radford (Australia) C Thompson	2	2
2	(Peru) L Gildemeister (United States) L McNeil	6	6

Quarterfinals
1	(Belgium) S Appelmans (Australia) N Provis	6	6
(Indonesia) Y Basuki (Indonesia) S Wibowo	0	2
4	(United States) A Frazier (Japan) M Kidowaki	6	6
(Japan) E Iida (United States) A May	2	1
(Mexico) L Novelo (United States) B Somerville	3	6	6^{3}
Q	(Japan) Y Kamio (Japan) A Kijimuta	6	4	7^{7}
(United States) C Cunningham (Sweden) C Lindqvist	6^{0}	2
2	(Peru) L Gildemeister (United States) L McNeil	7^{7}	6

Semifinals
1	(Belgium) S Appelmans (Australia) N Provis	3	0
4	(United States) A Frazier (Japan) M Kidowaki	6	6
Q	(Japan) Y Kamio (Japan) A Kijimuta	6	7
2	(Peru) L Gildemeister (United States) L McNeil	2	5

Final
4	(United States) A Frazier (Japan) M Kidowaki	6	6
Q	(Japan) Y Kamio (Japan) A Kijimuta	2	4
