= 1991 Suntory Japan Open Tennis Championships – Women's singles =

Women's singles
- 1991 Suntory Japan Open Tennis Championships

Final
- Champion: (United States) Lori McNeil
- Runner-up: (Belgium) Sabine Appelmans
- Score: 2–6, 6–2, 6–1

Details
- Draw: 32 (2WC/4Q)
- Seeds: 8

Events
Singles	men	women
Doubles	men	women
- Japan Open

Catarina Lindqvist was the defending champion, but lost in the second round to qualifier Kumiko Okamoto.

Lori McNeil won the title by defeating Sabine Appelmans 2–6, 6–2, 6–1 in the final.

== Seeds ==
1. (United States) Amy Frazier (quarterfinals)
2. (Belgium) Sabine Appelmans (final)
3. (Japan) Naoko Sawamatsu (first round)
4. (Sweden) Catarina Lindqvist (second round)
5. (Peru) Laura Gildemeister (semifinals)
6. (Czechoslovakia) Eva Švíglerová (quarterfinals)
7. (United States) Lori McNeil (champion)
8. (United States) Marianne Werdel (quarterfinals)

== Draw ==
Key

- Q = Qualifier
- WC = Wild card
- LL = Lucky loser
- Alt = Alternate
- ITF = ITF entry
- PR = Protected ranking
- SR = Special ranking
- SE = Special exempt
- JE = Junior exempt
- JR = Junior Accelerator Programme entrant
- CO = College Accelerator Programme entrant
- NG = Next Gen Accelerator Program entrant
- w/o = Walkover
- r = Retired
- d = Defaulted

=== Finals ===
Semifinals
7	(United States) Lori McNeil	7^{7}	6
5	(Peru) Laura Gildemeister	6^{4}	3
Q	(Japan) Rika Hiraki	4	4
2	(Belgium) Sabine Appelmans	6	6

Final
7	(United States) Lori McNeil	2	6	6
2	(Belgium) Sabine Appelmans	6	2	1

=== Top half ===
First round
1	(United States) A Frazier	6	6
(Netherlands) P Kamstra	0	3
(Japan) K Date	5	4
(Luxembourg) K Kschwendt	7	6
(United Kingdom) S Loosemore	2	5
(United States) C Cunningham	6	7
(Peru) P Vásquez	1	4
7	(United States) L McNeil	6	6
4	(Sweden) C Lindqvist	6	6
(Japan) M Kidowaki	1	3
(Australia) A Minter	3	4
Q	(Japan) K Okamoto	6	6
Q	(Indonesia) Y Basuki	2	6	7
(Japan) N Miyagi	6	4	5
(Japan) A Kijimuta	4	7	5
5	(Peru) L Gildemeister	6	5	7

Second round
1	(United States) A Frazier	6	6
(Luxembourg) K Kschwendt	4	3
(United States) C Cunningham	3	4
7	(United States) L McNeil	6	6
4	(Sweden) C Lindqvist	5	3
Q	(Japan) K Okamoto	7	6
Q	(Indonesia) Y Basuki	6	3	3
5	(Peru) L Gildemeister	3	6	6

Quarterfinals
1	(United States) A Frazier	3	3
7	(United States) L McNeil	6	6
Q	(Japan) K Okamoto	4	4
5	(Peru) L Gildemeister	6	6

Semifinals
7	(United States) L McNeil	7^{7}	6
5	(Peru) L Gildemeister	6^{4}	3

=== Bottom half ===
First round
6	(Czechoslovakia) E Švíglerová	6	7
(Australia) K Godridge	1	5
(United States) E deLone	2	6	7
(Japan) T Takagi	6	4	5
(Australia) N Provis	2	6^{5}
Q	(Japan) R Hiraki	6	7^{7}
(Netherlands) M Oremans	7	4	6
3	(Japan) N Sawamatsu	5	6	4
8	(United States) M Werdel	5	6	6
WC	(Japan) Y Kamio	7	3	3
(United Kingdom) M Javer	6	6
WC	(Japan) M Miyauchi	0	4
(Japan) M Endo	7^{7}	6
(Australia) L Field	6^{5}	0
Q	(Japan) M Yanagi	3	2
2	(Belgium) S Appelmans	6	6

Second round
6	(Czechoslovakia) E Švíglerová	6	2	6
(United States) E deLone	3	6	3
Q	(Japan) R Hiraki	7	7
(Netherlands) M Oremans	5	5
8	(United States) M Werdel	6	2	6
(United Kingdom) M Javer	2	6	1
(Japan) M Endo	3	1
2	(Belgium) S Appelmans	6	6

Quarterfinals
6	(Czechoslovakia) E Švíglerová	7^{7}	4	4
Q	(Japan) R Hiraki	6^{4}	6	6
8	(United States) M Werdel	3	6	1
2	(Belgium) S Appelmans	6	3	6

Semifinals
Q	(Japan) R Hiraki	4	4
2	(Belgium) S Appelmans	6	6
