= 1993 Japan Open Tennis Championships – Women's doubles =

Women's doubles
- 1993 Japan Open Tennis Championships

Final
- Champions: (Japan) Ei Iida (Japan) Maya Kidowaki
- Runners-up: (China) Li Fang (Japan) Kyōko Nagatsuka
- Score: 6–2, 4–6, 6–4

Events
Singles	men	women
Doubles	men	women
- Japan Open

Rika Hiraki and Amy Frazier were the defending champions, but Frazier did not compete this year. Hiraki teamed up with Karina Habšudová, but were defaulted in their first round match.

Ei Iida and Maya Kidowaki won the title by defeating Li Fang and Kyōko Nagatsuka 6–2, 4–6, 6–4 in the final.

== Seeds ==
1. (Australia) Nicole Provis / (Czech Republic) Andrea Strnadová (first round)
2. (Indonesia) Yayuk Basuki / (Japan) Nana Miyagi (quarterfinals)
3. (Slovakia) Karina Habšudová / (Japan) Rika Hiraki (first round, defaulted)
4. (Australia) Michelle Jaggard-Lai / (Germany) Wiltrud Probst (first round)

== Draw ==
Key

- Q = Qualifier
- WC = Wild card
- LL = Lucky loser
- Alt = Alternate
- ITF = ITF entry
- PR = Protected ranking
- SR = Special ranking
- SE = Special exempt
- JE = Junior exempt
- JR = Junior Accelerator Programme entrant
- CO = College Accelerator Programme entrant
- NG = Next Gen Accelerator Program entrant
- w/o = Walkover
- r = Retired
- d = Defaulted

=== Draw ===
First round
1	(Australia) N Provis (Czech Republic) A Strnadová	7^{7}	3	4
Q	(China) F Li (Japan) K Nagatsuka	6^{5}	6	6
(Japan) E Okagawa (Japan) M Yanagi	0	6	1
(Japan) K Takuma (Japan) Y Yoshida	6	2	6
3	(Slovakia) K Habšudová (Japan) R Hiraki	d
(Belgium) S Appelmans (Netherlands) M Oremans
(United States) C Cunningham (United States) M Werdel	4	6	3
(Japan) K Date (Czech Republic) E Švíglerová	6	4	6
WC	(Japan) M Endo (Japan) N Sawamatsu	5	4
(France) P Paradis-Mangon (France) S Testud	7	6
(Japan) E Iida (Japan) M Kidowaki	7	6
4	(Australia) M Jaggard-Lai (Germany) W Probst	5	3
(Japan) M Donoshiro (Japan) A Sugiyama	2	7	4
(Japan) A Hirose (Japan) Y Kamio	6	5	6
(Australia) J Limmer (Japan) M Miyauchi	0	6	3
2	(Indonesia) Y Basuki (Japan) N Miyagi	6	3	6

Quarterfinals
Q	(China) F Li (Japan) K Nagatsuka	3	6	6
(Japan) K Takuma (Japan) Y Yoshida	6	4	1
(Belgium) S Appelmans (Netherlands) M Oremans	4	0
(Japan) K Date (Czech Republic) E Švíglerová	6	6
(France) P Paradis-Mangon (France) S Testud	6	1	6^{5}
(Japan) E Iida (Japan) M Kidowaki	4	6	7^{7}
(Japan) A Hirose (Japan) Y Kamio	6	7^{9}
2	(Indonesia) Y Basuki (Japan) N Miyagi	4	6^{7}

Semifinals
Q	(China) F Li (Japan) K Nagatsuka	7^{7}	6
(Japan) K Date (Czech Republic) E Švíglerová	6^{4}	3
(Japan) E Iida (Japan) M Kidowaki	3	6	7^{7}
(Japan) A Hirose (Japan) Y Kamio	6	1	6^{4}

Final
Q	(China) F Li (Japan) K Nagatsuka	2	6	4
(Japan) E Iida (Japan) M Kidowaki	6	4	6
