= 1991 Suntory Japan Open Tennis Championships =

- Date: 8–14 April
- Edition: 18th
- Category: Championship Series (ATP); Tier IV (WTA)
- Surface: Hard / outdoor
- Location: Tokyo, Japan
- Venue: Ariake Coliseum

Champions

Men's singles
- (Sweden) Stefan Edberg

Women's singles
- (United States) Lori McNeil

Men's doubles
- (Sweden) Stefan Edberg / (Australia) Todd Woodbridge

Women's doubles
- (United States) Amy Frazier / (Japan) Maya Kidowaki
- Japan Open

The 1991 Suntory Japan Open Tennis Championships was a combined men's and women's tennis tournament played on outdoor hard courts at the Ariake Coliseum in Tokyo, Japan that was part of the Championship Series of the 1991 ATP Tour and of Tier IV of the 1991 WTA Tour. The tournament was held from 8 to 14 April 1991. Stefan Edberg and Lori McNeil won the singles titles.

== Finals ==
=== Men's singles ===
(Sweden) Stefan Edberg def. (United States) Ivan Lendl, 6–1, 7–5, 6–0

- It was Edberg's 2nd title of the year and the 29th of his career.

=== Women's singles ===
(United States) Lori McNeil def. (Belgium) Sabine Appelmans, 2–6, 6–2, 6–1

- It was McNeil's 2nd title of the year and the 7th of her career.

=== Men's doubles ===
(Sweden) Stefan Edberg / (Australia) Todd Woodbridge def. (Australia) John Fitzgerald / (Sweden) Anders Järryd, 6–4, 5–7, 6–4

=== Women's doubles ===
(United States) Amy Frazier / (Japan) Maya Kidowaki def. (Japan) Yone Kamio / (Japan) Akiko Kijimuta, 6–2, 6–4
