= 2024 Japan Open Tennis Championships =

- Date: 25 September–1 October
- Edition: 50th
- Category: ATP 500
- Draw: 32S/16D
- Prize money: $1,818,380
- Surface: Hard / outdoor
- Location: Tokyo, Japan
- Venue: Ariake Coliseum

Champions

Singles
- (France) Arthur Fils

Doubles
- (United Kingdom) Julian Cash / (United Kingdom) Lloyd Glasspool
← 2023 ·	Japan Open	· 2025 →

The 2024 Japan Open Tennis Championships (also known as the Kinoshita Group Japan Open Tennis Championships for sponsorship reasons) was a men's tennis tournament played on outdoor hardcourts. It was the 50th edition of the Japan Open, and an ATP 500 tournament on the 2024 ATP Tour. It was held at the Ariake Coliseum in Tokyo, Japan, from 25 September to 1 October 2024.

== Champions ==
=== Singles ===
- (France) Arthur Fils def. (France) Ugo Humbert, 5–7, 7–6^{(8–6)}, 6–3

=== Doubles ===
- (United Kingdom) Julian Cash / (United Kingdom) Lloyd Glasspool def. (Uruguay) Ariel Behar / (United States) Robert Galloway, 6–4, 4–6, [12–10]

== Singles main-draw entrants ==
=== Seeds ===
Country	Player	Rank^{1}	Seed
USA	Taylor Fritz	7	1
POL	Hubert Hurkacz	8	2
NOR	Casper Ruud	9	3
GRE	Stefanos Tsitsipas	12	4
USA	Tommy Paul	13	5
DEN	Holger Rune	14	6
USA	Frances Tiafoe	16	7
USA	Ben Shelton	17	8

- ^{1} Rankings are as of 16 September 2024.

=== Other entrants ===
The following players received wildcards into the singles main draw:

- (Japan) Shintaro Mochizuki
- (Japan) Kei Nishikori
- (Japan) Yoshihito Nishioka

The following player received entry as a special exempt:

- (United States) Brandon Nakashima

The following players received entry using a protected ranking:

- (Croatia) Marin Čilić
- (United States) Reilly Opelka

The following players received entry from the qualifying draw:

- (Italy) Mattia Bellucci
- (United States) Alex Michelsen
- (Australia) Christopher O'Connell
- (Netherlands) Botic van de Zandschulp

=== Withdrawals ===
- (Portugal) Nuno Borges → replaced by (Czech Republic) Tomáš Macháč
- (Australia) Alex de Minaur → replaced by (Italy) Matteo Berrettini

== Doubles main-draw entrants ==
=== Seeds ===
Country	Player	Country	Player	Rank^{1}	Seed
USA	Nathaniel Lammons	USA	Jackson Withrow	40	1
MON	Hugo Nys	POL	Jan Zieliński	53	2
FRA	Sadio Doumbia	FRA	Fabien Reboul	59	3
ARG	Máximo González	ARG	Andrés Molteni	64	4

- Rankings are as of 16 September 2024.

=== Other entrants ===
The following pairs received wildcards into the doubles main draw:

- (Japan) Kei Nishikori / (Japan) Rei Sakamoto
- (Japan) Yoshihito Nishioka / (Japan) Kaito Uesugi

The following pair received entry from the qualifying draw:

- (Austria) Alexander Erler / (Netherlands) Matwé Middelkoop

=== Withdrawals ===
- (Australia) Alex de Minaur / (Australia) Jordan Thompson → replaced by (United States) Ben Shelton / (Australia) Jordan Thompson
- (United States) Sebastian Korda / (United States) Ben Shelton → replaced by (Uruguay) Ariel Behar / (United States) Robert Galloway
