= 1993 Japan Open Tennis Championships – Men's singles =

Men's singles
- 1993 Japan Open Tennis Championships

Final
- Champion: (United States) Pete Sampras
- Runner-up: (United States) Brad Gilbert
- Score: 6–2, 6–2, 6–2

Details
- Draw: 56 (5WC/7Q/1LL)
- Seeds: 16

Events
Singles	men	women
Doubles	men	women
- Japan Open

Jim Courier was the defending champion, but lost in the third round to Jonathan Stark.

Pete Sampras won the title by defeating Brad Gilbert 6–2, 6–2, 6–2 in the final. By doing so, Sampras clinches the World No. 1 spot for the first time in his career.

== Seeds ==
The first eight seeds received a bye to the second round.

1. (United States) Jim Courier (third round)
2. (United States) Pete Sampras (champion)
3. (United States) Michael Chang (second round)
4. (Russia) Alexander Volkov (third round)
5. (Sweden) Henrik Holm (semifinals)
6. (Australia) Wally Masur (semifinals)
7. (United States) Brad Gilbert (final)
8. (Israel) Amos Mansdorf (third round)
9. (New Zealand) Brett Steven (second round)
10. (United States) David Wheaton (quarterfinals)
11. (Netherlands) Jan Siemerink (third round)
12. (Denmark) Kenneth Carlsen (second round)
13. (Sweden) Christian Bergström (third round)
14. (United States) Jim Grabb (first round)
15. (France) Guillaume Raoux (third round)
16. (Russia) Andrei Cherkasov (second round)

== Draw ==
Key

- Q = Qualifier
- WC = Wild card
- LL = Lucky loser
- Alt = Alternate
- ITF = ITF entry
- PR = Protected ranking
- SR = Special ranking
- SE = Special exempt
- JE = Junior exempt
- JR = Junior Accelerator Programme entrant
- CO = College Accelerator Programme entrant
- NG = Next Gen Accelerator Program entrant
- w/o = Walkover
- r = Retired
- d = Defaulted

=== Finals ===
Quarterfinals
(United States) Jonathan Stark	7^{7}	2	0
7	(United States) Brad Gilbert	6^{4}	6	6
Q	(Australia) Neil Borwick	2	3
5	(Sweden) Henrik Holm	6	6
6	(Australia) Wally Masur	6	6
(Australia) Todd Woodbridge	4	0
10	(United States) David Wheaton	3	6	4
2	(United States) Pete Sampras	6	3	6

Semifinals
7	(United States) Brad Gilbert	6	3	6
5	(Sweden) Henrik Holm	1	6	3
6	(Australia) Wally Masur	4	2
2	(United States) Pete Sampras	6	6

Final
7	(United States) Brad Gilbert	2	2	2
2	(United States) Pete Sampras	6	6	6

=== Top half ===
==== Section 1 ====
First round
(Australia) S Youl	2	4
(Czech Republic) M Damm	6	6
(United States) J Stark	6	6^{9}	6
(Czech Republic) M Střelba	4	7^{11}	2
(Germany) K Braasch	7^{7}	5	4
16	(Russia) A Cherkasov	6^{3}	7	6
9	(New Zealand) B Steven	7^{7}	6
(United States) T Ho	6^{5}	3
Q	(United States) D Flach	7	6
(Germany) L Koslowski	5	1
(Germany) P Kühnen	2	2
(Canada) C Pridham	6	6

Second round
1	(United States) J Courier	7^{8}	6
(Czech Republic) M Damm	6^{6}	4
(United States) J Stark	6	6
16	(Russia) A Cherkasov	4	1
9	(New Zealand) B Steven	3	2
Q	(United States) D Flach	6	6
(Canada) C Pridham	7	2	1
7	(United States) B Gilbert	5	6	6

Third round
1	(United States) J Courier	4	2
(United States) J Stark	6	6
Q	(United States) D Flach	7	1	4
7	(United States) B Gilbert	5	6	6

Quarterfinals
(United States) J Stark	7^{7}	2	0
7	(United States) B Gilbert	6^{4}	6	6

==== Section 2 ====
First round
(Germany) P Baur	1	2
LL	(Australia) J Stoltenberg	6	6
WC	(Japan) G Motomura	4	1
Q	(United States) K Jones	6	6
Q	(Australia) N Borwick	6	6
14	(United States) J Grabb	1	1
12	(Denmark) K Carlsen	6	6
Q	(United States) T Mercer	4	1
(Czech Republic) D Vacek	6	6
Q	(Sweden) R Bergh	4	3
WC	(Japan) T Shimada	4	1
(United States) A O'Brien	6	6

Second round
4	(Russia) A Volkov	6	6
LL	(Australia) J Stoltenberg	2	4
Q	(United States) K Jones	1	4
Q	(Australia) N Borwick	6	6
12	(Denmark) K Carlsen	6^{5}	5
(Czech Republic) D Vacek	7^{7}	7
(United States) A O'Brien	2	6	3
5	(Sweden) H Holm	6	4	6

Third round
4	(Russia) A Volkov	7^{7}	4	6^{3}
Q	(Australia) N Borwick	6^{3}	6	7^{7}
(Czech Republic) D Vacek	4	4
5	(Sweden) H Holm	6	6

Quarterfinals
Q	(Australia) N Borwick	2	3
5	(Sweden) H Holm	6	6

=== Bottom half ===
==== Section 3 ====
First round
(Australia) S Stolle	1	6	2
(Portugal) J Cunha e Silva	6	4	6
WC	(Japan) Y Yamamoto	7^{9}	6^{4}	3
WC	(Japan) H Kaneko	6^{7}	7^{7}	6
(Italy) S Pescosolido	6	6^{4}	5
11	(Netherlands) J Siemerink	2	7^{7}	7
13	(Sweden) C Bergström	6	6^{5}	7
Q	(United States) K Thorne	3	7^{7}	5
(United States) C Adams	6	2	2
Q	(United States) P McEnroe	0	6	6
(Japan) S Matsuoka	5	0
(Australia) T Woodbridge	7	6

Second round
6	(Australia) W Masur	6	6
(Portugal) J Cunha e Silva	4	2
WC	(Japan) H Kaneko	2	3
11	(Netherlands) J Siemerink	6	6
13	(Sweden) C Bergström	6	6
Q	(United States) P McEnroe	4	1
(Australia) T Woodbridge	6	3	7^{7}
3	(United States) M Chang	3	6	6^{5}

Third round
6	(Australia) W Masur	6^{4}	6	6
11	(Netherlands) J Siemerink	7^{7}	4	2
13	(Sweden) C Bergström	6	6^{4}	3
(Australia) T Woodbridge	3	7^{7}	6

Quarterfinals
6	(Australia) W Masur	6	6
(Australia) T Woodbridge	4	0

==== Section 4 ====
First round
(South Africa) C van Rensburg	6^{3}	7^{7}	6
(Australia) R Fromberg	7^{7}	6^{2}	4
(Italy) D Nargiso	6	1	1^{r}
(United States) R Weiss	4	6	4
WC	(Japan) R Tsujino	4	3
10	(United States) D Wheaton	6	6
15	(France) G Raoux	7^{7}	6
(United Kingdom) J Bates	6^{3}	3
(France) S Simian	7^{8}	7^{7}
(Austria) A Antonitsch	6^{6}	6^{3}
(Germany) D Prinosil	3	6	3
(Australia) J Morgan	6	2	6

Second round
8	(Israel) A Mansdorf	6	5	7
(South Africa) C van Rensburg	1	7	5
(United States) R Weiss	2	6	4
10	(United States) D Wheaton	6	3	6
15	(France) G Raoux	6	6
(France) S Simian	1	1
(Australia) J Morgan	5	3
2	(United States) P Sampras	7	6

Third round
8	(Israel) A Mansdorf	1	2
10	(United States) D Wheaton	6	6
15	(France) G Raoux	4	7^{7}	3
2	(United States) P Sampras	6	6^{4}	6

Quarterfinals
10	(United States) D Wheaton	3	6	4
2	(United States) P Sampras	6	3	6
