= 1993 Japan Open Tennis Championships =

- Date: 5–11 April
- Edition: 20th
- Surface: Hard / outdoor
- Location: Tokyo, Japan
- Venue: Ariake Coliseum

Champions

Men's singles
- (United States) Pete Sampras

Women's singles
- (Japan) Kimiko Date

Men's doubles
- (United States) Ken Flach / (United States) Rick Leach

Women's doubles
- (Japan) Ei Iida / (Japan) Maya Kidowaki
- Japan Open

The 1993 Japan Open Tennis Championships was a combined men's and women's tennis tournament played on outdoor hardcourts at the Ariake Coliseum in Tokyo in Japan that was part of the Championship Series of the 1993 ATP Tour and of Tier III of the 1993 WTA Tour. The tournament was held from 5 April through 11 April 1993. Pete Sampras and Kimiko Date won the singles titles.

== Finals ==
=== Men's singles ===
(United States) Pete Sampras defeated (United States) Brad Gilbert 6–2, 6–2, 6–2

- It was Sampras' 3rd title of the year and the 16th of his career.

=== Women's singles ===
(Japan) Kimiko Date defeated (Netherlands) Stephanie Rottier 6–1, 6–3

- It was Date's 1st title of the year and the 2nd of her career.

=== Men's doubles ===
(United States) Ken Flach / (United States) Rick Leach defeated (Canada) Glenn Michibata / (United States) David Pate 2–6, 6–3, 6–4

=== Women's doubles ===
(Japan) Ei Iida / (Japan) Maya Kidowaki defeated (China) Li Fang / (Japan) Kyōko Nagatsuka 6–2, 4–6, 6–4
