= 1991 Suntory Japan Open Tennis Championships – Men's singles =

Men's singles
- 1991 Suntory Japan Open Tennis Championships

Final
- Champion: (Sweden) Stefan Edberg
- Runner-up: (Czechoslovakia) Ivan Lendl
- Score: 6–1, 7–5, 6–0

Details
- Draw: 56 (7Q / 5WC)
- Seeds: 16

Events
Singles	men	women
Doubles	men	women
- Japan Open

First-seeded Stefan Edberg was the defending champion, and won the title again defeating Ivan Lendl in the final 6–1, 7–5, 6–0.

== Seeds ==
The top eight seeds received a bye into the second round.

1. (Sweden) Stefan Edberg (champion)
2. (Czechoslovakia) Ivan Lendl (final)
3. (United States) Brad Gilbert (third round)
4. (United States) Jim Courier (semifinals)
5. (United States) Michael Chang (semifinals)
6. (United States) John McEnroe (quarterfinals)
7. (Germany) Michael Stich (quarterfinals)
8. (Switzerland) Jakob Hlasek (quarterfinals)
9. (United States) Aaron Krickstein (first round)
10. (Sweden) Anders Järryd (third round)
11. (Israel) Amos Mansdorf (second round)
12. (Australia) Todd Woodbridge (first round)
13. (Netherlands) Jan Siemerink (first round)
14. (Australia) Pat Cash (quarterfinals)
15. (United States) Kevin Curren (first round)
16. (Australia) Wally Masur (second round)

== Draw ==
Key

- Q = Qualifier
- WC = Wild card
- LL = Lucky loser
- Alt = Alternate
- ITF = ITF entry
- PR = Protected ranking
- SR = Special ranking
- SE = Special exempt
- JE = Junior exempt
- JR = Junior Accelerator Programme entrant
- CO = College Accelerator Programme entrant
- NG = Next Gen Accelerator Program entrant
- w/o = Walkover
- r = Retired
- d = Defaulted

=== Finals ===
Quarterfinals
1	(Sweden) Stefan Edberg	7^{7}	6
7	(Germany) Michael Stich	6^{5}	3
14	(Australia) Pat Cash	4	1
5	(United States) Michael Chang	6	6
6	(United States) John McEnroe	2	2
4	(United States) Jim Courier	6	6
8	(Switzerland) Jakob Hlasek	1	4
2	(Czechoslovakia) Ivan Lendl	6	6

Semifinals
1	(Sweden) Stefan Edberg	7	6
5	(United States) Michael Chang	5	2
4	(United States) Jim Courier	4	1
2	(Czechoslovakia) Ivan Lendl	6	6

Final
1	(Sweden) Stefan Edberg	6	7	6
2	(Czechoslovakia) Ivan Lendl	1	5	0

=== Top half ===
==== Section 1 ====
First round
(France) G Raoux	3	3
Q	(New Zealand) K Evernden	6	6
WC	(United States) J Connors	1	6	6
Q	(United States) J Pugh	6	4	0
(Belgium) E Masso	4	3
16	(Australia) W Masur	6	6
10	(Sweden) A Järryd	6	6
(Australia) J Stoltenberg	0	3
(Mexico) L Herrera	6	6
(Netherlands) J Eltingh	2	2
(South Africa) G Muller	6^{4}	6	3
(United States) T Mayotte	7^{7}	4	6

Second round
1	(Sweden) S Edberg	6	7^{7}
Q	(New Zealand) K Evernden	2	6^{2}
WC	(United States) J Connors	3	7^{7}	7
16	(Australia) W Masur	6	6^{5}	5
10	(Sweden) A Järryd	6	6
(Mexico) L Herrera	1	0
(United States) T Mayotte	5	4
7	(Germany) M Stich	7	6

Third round
1	(Sweden) S Edberg	6	6^{5}	6
WC	(United States) J Connors	4	7^{7}	1
10	(Sweden) A Järryd	6^{4}	2
7	(Germany) M Stich	7^{7}	6

Quarterfinals
1	(Sweden) S Edberg	7^{7}	6
7	(Germany) M Stich	6^{5}	3

==== Section 2 ====
First round
(Canada) G Connell	7^{11}	3	7^{8}
Q	(Sweden) J Apell	6^{9}	6	6^{6}
(Austria) A Antonitsch	2	3
(Canada) A Sznajder	6	6
WC	(Japan) T Tsuchihashi	2	5
14	(Australia) P Cash	6	7
12	(Australia) T Woodbridge	6	3	3
(United States) D Pate	1	6	6
(Germany) P Baur	6	6
Q	(Italy) G Pozzi	4	4
(Netherlands) R Krajicek	1	4
Q	(Australia) J Fitzgerald	6	6

Second round
3	(United States) B Gilbert	6	7^{7}
(Canada) G Connell	1	6^{3}
(Canada) A Sznajder	2	4
14	(Australia) P Cash	6	6
(United States) D Pate	6	6
(Germany) P Baur	1	4
Q	(Australia) J Fitzgerald	0	0
5	(United States) M Chang	6	6

Third round
3	(United States) B Gilbert	4	6	3
14	(Australia) P Cash	6	1	6
(United States) D Pate	4	6^{5}
5	(United States) M Chang	6	7^{7}

Quarterfinals
14	(Australia) P Cash	4	1
5	(United States) M Chang	6	6

=== Bottom half ===
==== Section 3 ====
First round
(United States) B Garrow	0	6^{5}
Q	(Socialist Federal Republic of Yugoslavia) S Živojinović	6	7^{7}
(United States) T Witsken	6	6
WC	(Japan) E Furusho	1	3
(Israel) G Bloom	2	1
11	(Israel) A Mansdorf	6	6
13	(Netherlands) J Siemerink	4	6	6^{5}
(United States) D Goldie	6	3	7^{7}
Q	(United States) J Stimpson	6	6
WC	(Japan) K Masuda	1	1
(United States) J Grabb	4	6	7^{7}
(United States) J Tarango	6	3	6^{5}

Second round
6	(United States) J McEnroe	6	6
Q	(Socialist Federal Republic of Yugoslavia) S Živojinović	1	4
(United States) T Witsken	6	1	6
11	(Israel) A Mansdorf	2	6	3
(United States) D Goldie	6	7^{8}
Q	(United States) J Stimpson	3	6^{6}
(United States) J Grabb	7^{9}	2	3
4	(United States) J Courier	6^{7}	6	6

Third round
6	(United States) J McEnroe	3	7^{7}	6
(United States) T Witsken	6	6^{5}	4
(United States) D Goldie	3	4
4	(United States) J Courier	6	6

Quarterfinals
6	(United States) J McEnroe	2	2
4	(United States) J Courier	6	6

==== Section 4 ====
First round
(Australia) M Kratzmann	4	2
(Germany) U Riglewski	6	6
(Germany) A Mronz	6	6
WC	(Japan) Y Yamamoto	1	2
(Germany) P Kühnen	6	7
9	(United States) A Krickstein	2	5
15	(United States) K Curren	6^{5}	2
(Japan) S Matsuoka	7^{7}	6
(South Africa) C van Rensburg	5	4
(Peru) J Yzaga	7	6
(India) R Krishnan	6	6
(Sweden) T Högstedt	1	3

Second round
8	(Switzerland) J Hlasek	7^{7}	6
(Germany) U Riglewski	6^{2}	4
(Germany) A Mronz	6	6
(Germany) P Kühnen	4	4
(Japan) S Matsuoka	1	6^{3}
(Peru) J Yzaga	6	7^{7}
(India) R Krishnan	3	2
2	(Czechoslovakia) I Lendl	6	6

Third round
8	(Switzerland) J Hlasek	6	6^{1}	7
(Germany) A Mronz	1	7^{7}	5
(Peru) J Yzaga	5	3
2	(Czechoslovakia) I Lendl	7	6

Quarterfinals
8	(Switzerland) J Hlasek	1	4
2	(Czechoslovakia) I Lendl	6	6
