= 2014 Rakuten Japan Open Tennis Championships =

- Date: 29 September – 5 October
- Edition: 41st
- Category: ATP World Tour 500
- Surface: Hard / outdoor
- Location: Tokyo, Japan

Champions

Singles
- (Japan) Kei Nishikori

Doubles
- (France) Pierre-Hugues Herbert / (Poland) Michał Przysiężny
← 2013 ·	Japan Open	· 2015 →

The 2014 Rakuten Japan Open Tennis Championships was a men's tennis tournament played on outdoor hard courts. It was the 41st edition of the event known this year as the Rakuten Japan Open Tennis Championships, and part of the 500 Series of the 2014 ATP World Tour. It was held at the Ariake Coliseum in Tokyo, Japan, from September 29 till October 5, 2014.

== Points and prize money ==
=== Point distribution ===
Event	W	F	SF	QF	Round of 16	Round of 32	Q	Q2	Q1
Singles	500	300	180	90	45	0	20	10	0
Doubles	500	300	180	90	0	—	—	—	—

=== Prize money ===
Event	W	F	SF	QF	Round of 16	Round of 32	Q2	Q1
Singles	$296,850	$133,830	$63,395	$30,580	$15,600	$8,580	$965	$535
Doubles	$87,700	$39,550	$18,650	$9,020	$4,630	—	—	—

== Singles main-draw entrants ==
=== Seeds ===
Country	Player	Rank^{1}	Seed
SUI	Stan Wawrinka	4	1
ESP	David Ferrer	5	2
CAN	Milos Raonic	6	3
JPN	Kei Nishikori	8	4
FRA	Jo-Wilfried Tsonga	12	5
ESP	Roberto Bautista Agut	17	6
RSA	Kevin Anderson	19	7
UKR	Alexandr Dolgopolov	23	8

- ^{1} Rankings are as of September 22, 2014.

=== Other entrants ===
The following players received wildcards into the singles main draw:

- (Japan) Taro Daniel
- (Japan) Tatsuma Ito
- (Japan) Go Soeda

The following players received entry from the qualifying draw:

- (France) Pierre-Hugues Herbert
- (Japan) Hiroki Moriya
- (Poland) Michał Przysiężny
- (United States) Rajeev Ram

=== Withdrawals ===
Before the tournament

- (Argentina) Juan Martín del Potro (wrist injury)
- (Australia) Lleyton Hewitt
- (France) Gaël Monfils
- (France) Benoît Paire
- (Czech Republic) Radek Štěpánek

=== Retirements ===
- (Spain) Roberto Bautista Agut (quad strain)
- (Finland) Jarkko Nieminen (hip injury)
- (France) Édouard Roger-Vasselin (fatigue)

== Doubles main-draw entrants ==
=== Seeds ===
Country	Player	Country	Player	Rank^{1}	Seed
USA	Bob Bryan	USA	Mike Bryan	2	1
CRO	Ivan Dodig	BRA	Marcelo Melo	13	2
ESP	Marcel Granollers	ESP	Marc López	23	3
USA	Eric Butorac	RSA	Raven Klaasen	42	4

- Rankings are as of September 22, 2014

=== Other entrants ===
The following pairs received wildcards into the doubles main draw:

- (Japan) Tatsuma Ito / (Japan) Go Soeda
- (Japan) Kei Nishikori / (Japan) Yasutaka Uchiyama

The following pair received entry from the qualifying draw:

- (United Kingdom) Jamie Delgado / (Luxembourg) Gilles Müller

The following pair received entry as lucky losers:

- (France) Pierre-Hugues Herbert / (Poland) Michał Przysiężny

=== Withdrawals ===
Before the tournament

- (France) Jo-Wilfried Tsonga (stomach virus)

During the tournament

- (Japan) Kei Nishikori (hip injury)

== Finals ==
=== Singles ===
- (Japan) Kei Nishikori defeated (Canada) Milos Raonic, 7–6^{(7–5)}, 4–6, 6–4

=== Doubles ===
- (France) Pierre-Hugues Herbert / (Poland) Michał Przysiężny defeated (Croatia) Ivan Dodig / (Brazil) Marcelo Melo, 6–3, 6–7^{(3–7)}, [10–5]
