= 2024 Japan Open Tennis Championships – Doubles =

Doubles
- 2024 Japan Open Tennis Championships

Final
- Champions: (United Kingdom) Julian Cash (United Kingdom) Lloyd Glasspool
- Runners-up: (Uruguay) Ariel Behar (United States) Robert Galloway
- Score: 6–4, 4–6, [12–10]

Events
Singles	Doubles
← 2023 ·	Japan Open	· 2025 →

Julian Cash and Lloyd Glasspool defeated Ariel Behar and Robert Galloway in the final, 6–4, 4–6, [12–10] to win the doubles tennis title at the 2024 Japan Open Tennis Championships.

Rinky Hijikata and Max Purcell were the reigning champions, but Purcell chose not to participate this year. Hijikata partnered with Alexei Popyrin, but lost in the first round to Hugo Nys and Jan Zieliński.

== Seeds ==
1. (United States) Nathaniel Lammons / (United States) Jackson Withrow (quarterfinals)
2. (Monaco) Hugo Nys / (Poland) Jan Zieliński (quarterfinals)
3. (France) Sadio Doumbia / (France) Fabien Reboul (quarterfinals)
4. (Argentina) Máximo González / (Argentina) Andrés Molteni (first round)

== Draw ==
=== Key ===
- Q = Qualifier
- WC = Wild card
- LL = Lucky loser
- Alt = Alternate
- ITF = ITF entry
- PR = Protected ranking
- SR = Special ranking
- SE = Special exempt
- JE = Junior exempt
- JR = Junior Accelerator Programme entrant
- CO = College Accelerator Programme entrant
- NG = Next Gen Accelerator Program entrant
- w/o = Walkover
- r = Retired
- d = Defaulted

=== Draw ===
First round
1	(United States) N Lammons (United States) J Withrow	6^{6}	6	[10]
WC	(Japan) K Nishikori (Japan) R Sakamoto	7^{8}	4	[6]
(Uruguay) A Behar (United States) R Galloway	6	3	[10]
(Czech Republic) A Pavlásek (Netherlands) J-J Rojer	4	6	[5]
3	(France) S Doumbia (France) F Reboul	6	3	[10]
(Belgium) S Gillé (Belgium) J Vliegen	3	6	[3]
Q	(Austria) A Erler (Netherlands) M Middelkoop	6	6^{4}	[8]
(United Kingdom) J Draper (Czech Republic) T Macháč	4	7^{7}	[10]
(United States) B Shelton (Australia) J Thompson	7^{7}	6
WC	(Japan) Y Nishioka (Japan) K Uesugi	6^{3}	2
(United Kingdom) J Cash (United Kingdom) L Glasspool	5	6	[10]
4	(Argentina) M González (Argentina) A Molteni	7	3	[5]
(Italy) L Darderi (Argentina) TM Etcheverry	3	7^{7}	[7]
(United States) A Michelsen (Chile) A Tabilo	6	6^{5}	[10]
(Australia) R Hijikata (Australia) A Popyrin	4	7^{8}	[11]
2	(Monaco) H Nys (Poland) J Zieliński	6	6^{6}	[13]

Quarterfinals
1	(United States) N Lammons (United States) J Withrow	7^{8}	4	[7]
(Uruguay) A Behar (United States) R Galloway	6^{6}	6	[10]
3	(France) S Doumbia (France) F Reboul	7	2	[8]
(United Kingdom) J Draper (Czech Republic) T Macháč	5	6	[10]
(United States) B Shelton (Australia) J Thompson
(United Kingdom) J Cash (United Kingdom) L Glasspool	w/o
(United States) A Michelsen (Chile) A Tabilo	7	3	[10]
2	(Monaco) H Nys (Poland) J Zieliński	5	6	[7]

Semifinals
(Uruguay) A Behar (United States) R Galloway	w/o
(United Kingdom) J Draper (Czech Republic) T Macháč
(United Kingdom) J Cash (United Kingdom) L Glasspool	6	6
(United States) A Michelsen (Chile) A Tabilo	3	3

Final
(Uruguay) A Behar (United States) R Galloway	4	6	[10]
(United Kingdom) J Cash (United Kingdom) L Glasspool	6	4	[12]

== Qualifying ==
=== Seeds ===
1. (Colombia) Nicolás Barrientos / (Tunisia) Skander Mansouri (qualifying competition)
2. (Austria) Alexander Erler / (Netherlands) Matwé Middelkoop (qualified)

=== Qualifiers ===
1. (Austria) Alexander Erler / (Netherlands) Matwé Middelkoop

=== Qualifying draw ===
First round
1	(Colombia) Nicolás Barrientos (Tunisia) Skander Mansouri	6	6
WC	(Japan) Shintaro Mochizuki (Japan) Takeru Yuzuki	3	2
(United States) Evan King (United States) Reese Stalder	2	4
2	(Austria) Alexander Erler (Netherlands) Matwé Middelkoop	6	6

Qualifying competition
1	(Colombia) Nicolás Barrientos (Tunisia) Skander Mansouri	4	4
2	(Austria) Alexander Erler (Netherlands) Matwé Middelkoop	6	6
