= 2023 Japan Open Tennis Championships – Singles =

Singles
- 2023 Japan Open Tennis Championships

Final
- Champion: (United States) Ben Shelton
- Runner-up: Aslan Karatsev
- Score: 7–5, 6–1

Details
- Draw: 32 (4Q / 3WC)
- Seeds: 8

Events
Singles	Doubles
← 2022 ·	Japan Open	· 2024 →

Ben Shelton defeated Aslan Karatsev in the final, 7–5, 6–1 to win the singles tennis title at the 2023 Japan Open. It was his first ATP Tour title. He and his father Bryan Shelton became the fourth father-son duo in the Open Era to win tour-level singles titles.

Taylor Fritz was the defending champion, but lost in the second round to Shintaro Mochizuki.

== Seeds ==
1. (United States) Taylor Fritz (second round)
2. (Norway) Casper Ruud (second round)
3. (Germany) Alexander Zverev (first round)
4. (Australia) Alex de Minaur (quarterfinals)
5. (United States) Tommy Paul (quarterfinals)
6. (United States) Frances Tiafoe (first round)
7. Karen Khachanov (first round)
8. (Canada) Félix Auger-Aliassime (quarterfinals)

== Draw ==
=== Key ===
- Q = Qualifier
- WC = Wild card
- LL = Lucky loser
- Alt = Alternate
- SE = Special exempt
- PR = Protected ranking
- ITF = ITF entry
- JE = Junior exempt
- w/o = Walkover
- r = Retired
- d = Defaulted
- SR = Special ranking

=== Finals ===
Semifinals
WC	(Japan) Shintaro Mochizuki	3	4
Aslan Karatsev	6	6
(United States) Ben Shelton	6^{2}	7^{7}	6
Q	(United States) Marcos Giron	7^{7}	6^{5}	4

Final
Aslan Karatsev	5	1
(United States) Ben Shelton	7	6

=== Top half ===
First round
1	(United States) T Fritz	6	6
(United Kingdom) C Norrie	4	3
WC	(Japan) S Mochizuki	6	7^{7}
(Argentina) TM Etcheverry	4	6^{5}
WC	(Japan) S Shimabukuro	4	6	3
Q	(Chile) C Garín	6	3	6
(Australia) A Popyrin	6	6
7	K Khachanov	4	2
4	(Australia) A de Minaur	4	7^{7}	7^{7}
Q	(United Kingdom) J Draper	6	6^{4}	6^{1}
(Argentina) F Cerúndolo	4	1
(Argentina) D Schwartzman	6	6
(China) Z Zhang	3	6	7^{7}
(Poland) H Hurkacz	6	4	6^{4}
A Karatsev	6	7^{7}
6	(United States) F Tiafoe	3	6^{4}

Second round
1	(United States) T Fritz	6	4	6^{2}
WC	(Japan) S Mochizuki	0	6	7^{7}
Q	(Chile) C Garín	6	6^{3}	2
(Australia) A Popyrin	4	7^{7}	6
4	(Australia) A de Minaur	6	7
(Argentina) D Schwartzman	0	5
(China) Z Zhang	3	4
A Karatsev	6	6

Quarterfinals
WC	(Japan) S Mochizuki	7	2	7
(Australia) A Popyrin	5	6	5
4	(Australia) A de Minaur	3	2
A Karatsev	6	6

Semifinals
WC	(Japan) S Mochizuki	3	4
A Karatsev	6	6

=== Bottom half ===
First round
5	(United States) T Paul	3	6	6
(Germany) D Altmaier	6	1	3
(United States) M McDonald	7	6
(Australia) M Purcell	5	4
(United States) B Shelton	3	6	7^{7}
Q	(Japan) T Daniel	6	4	6^{2}
(Australia) J Thompson	6	6
3	(Germany) A Zverev	3	4
8	(Canada) F Auger-Aliassime	7^{7}	6^{2}	6
(Australia) A Vukic	6^{3}	7^{7}	2
(Austria) S Ofner	6^{2}	7^{7}	7
(Australia) C O'Connell	7^{7}	6^{5}	5
(Japan) Y Nishioka	6^{14}	6	1
Q	(United States) M Giron	7^{16}	4	6
WC	(Japan) Y Watanuki	6^{6}	3
2	(Norway) C Ruud	7^{8}	6

Second round
5	(United States) T Paul	6	6
(United States) M McDonald	4	2
(United States) B Shelton	6^{5}	6	6
(Australia) J Thompson	7^{7}	4	3
8	(Canada) F Auger-Aliassime	6	6
(Austria) S Ofner	4	1
Q	(United States) M Giron	6	6
2	(Norway) C Ruud	3	4

Quarterfinals
5	(United States) T Paul	6^{4}	3
(United States) B Shelton	7^{7}	6
8	(Canada) F Auger-Aliassime	1	4
Q	(United States) M Giron	6	6

Semifinals
(United States) B Shelton	6^{2}	7^{7}	6
Q	(United States) M Giron	7^{7}	6^{5}	4

== Qualifying ==
=== Seeds ===
1. (Australia) Rinky Hijikata (qualifying competition)
2. (United States) Marcos Giron (qualified)
3. (United Kingdom) Jack Draper (qualified)
4. (Japan) Taro Daniel (qualified)
5. (Chile) Cristian Garín (qualified)
6. (Austria) Jurij Rodionov (qualifying competition)
7. (United States) Brandon Nakashima (first round)
8. (Chinese Taipei) Wu Tung-lin (first round)

=== Qualifiers ===
1. (Chile) Cristian Garín
2. (United States) Marcos Giron
3. (United Kingdom) Jack Draper
4. (Japan) Taro Daniel

=== Qualifying draw ===
==== First qualifier ====
First round
1	(Australia) Rinky Hijikata	6	7
WC	(Japan) Naoki Nakagawa	4	5
(Australia) Philip Sekulic	6^{3}	3
5	(Chile) Cristian Garín	7^{7}	6

Qualifying competition
1	(Australia) Rinky Hijikata	7	3	2
5	(Chile) Cristian Garín	5	6	6

==== Second qualifier ====
First round
2	(United States) Marcos Giron	6	6
WC	(Japan) Kaichi Uchida	4	3
(Japan) Yasutaka Uchiyama	7^{8}	4	6
7	(United States) Brandon Nakashima	6^{6}	6	3

Qualifying competition
2	(United States) Marcos Giron	6	6
(Japan) Yasutaka Uchiyama	3	2

==== Third qualifier ====
First round
3	(United Kingdom) Jack Draper	6	6
(Japan) Yuta Shimizu	4	4
WC	(Japan) Hiroki Moriya	4	7	3
6	(Austria) Jurij Rodionov	6	5	6

Qualifying competition
3	(United Kingdom) Jack Draper	6	6
6	(Austria) Jurij Rodionov	1	0

==== Fourth qualifier ====
First round
4	(Japan) Taro Daniel	6^{1}	6	6
(Chinese Taipei) Jason Jung	7^{7}	3	3
(Japan) Rio Noguchi	5	6	6
8	(Chinese Taipei) Wu Tung-lin	7	0	3

Qualifying competition
4	(Japan) Taro Daniel	7	6
(Japan) Rio Noguchi	5	4
