= 2014 Rakuten Japan Open Tennis Championships – Doubles =

Doubles
- 2014 Rakuten Japan Open Tennis Championships

Final
- Champions: (France) Pierre-Hugues Herbert (Poland) Michał Przysiężny
- Runners-up: (Croatia) Ivan Dodig (Brazil) Marcelo Melo
- Score: 6–3, 6–7^{(3–7)}, [10–5]

Details
- Draw: 16 (1Q / 2WC)
- Seeds: 4

Events
Singles	Doubles
- Japan Open

Rohan Bopanna and Édouard Roger-Vasselin were the defending champions, but chose not to participate together. Bopanna played alongside Leander Paes, but lost in the quarterfinals to Ivan Dodig and Marcelo Melo. Roger-Vasselin teamed up with Daniele Bracciali, but lost in the first round to Dodig and Melo.

Pierre-Hugues Herbert and Michał Przysiężny won the title, defeating Dodig and Melo in the final, 6–3, 6–7^{(3–7)}, [10–5].

== Seeds ==
1. (United States) Bob Bryan / (United States) Mike Bryan (first round)
2. (Croatia) Ivan Dodig / (Brazil) Marcelo Melo (final)
3. (Spain) Marcel Granollers / (Spain) Marc López (semifinals)
4. (United States) Eric Butorac / (South Africa) Raven Klaasen (semifinals)

== Draw ==
Key

- Q = Qualifier
- WC = Wild card
- LL = Lucky loser
- Alt = Alternate
- ITF = ITF entry
- PR = Protected ranking
- SR = Special ranking
- SE = Special exempt
- JE = Junior exempt
- JR = Junior Accelerator Programme entrant
- CO = College Accelerator Programme entrant
- NG = Next Gen Accelerator Program entrant
- w/o = Walkover
- r = Retired
- d = Defaulted

=== Draw ===
First round
1	(United States) B Bryan (United States) M Bryan	6	3	[4]
LL	(France) P-H Herbert (Poland) M Przysiężny	4	6	[10]
(United Kingdom) J Murray (Australia) J Peers	6	5	[10]
(United States) S Johnson (United States) J Sock	3	7	[7]
4	(United States) E Butorac (South Africa) R Klaasen	6	6
(United Kingdom) D Inglot (Romania) F Mergea	4	2
PR	(France) J Chardy (Austria) J Melzer	6	7^{8}
(United States) S Lipsky (United States) R Ram	4	6^{6}
(Poland) M Fyrstenberg (Philippines) T Huey	2	4
WC	(Japan) K Nishikori (Japan) Y Uchiyama	6	6
Q	(United Kingdom) J Delgado (Luxembourg) G Müller	2	1
3	(Spain) M Granollers (Spain) M López	6	6
WC	(Japan) T Ito (Japan) G Soeda	1	6^{7}
(India) R Bopanna (India) L Paes	6	7^{9}
(Italy) D Bracciali (France) É Roger-Vasselin	6^{2}	4
2	(Croatia) I Dodig (Brazil) M Melo	7^{7}	6

Quarterfinals
LL	(France) P-H Herbert (Poland) M Przysiężny	6	6
(United Kingdom) J Murray (Australia) J Peers	4	2
4	(United States) E Butorac (South Africa) R Klaasen	6	6
PR	(France) J Chardy (Austria) J Melzer	2	0
WC	(Japan) K Nishikori (Japan) Y Uchiyama
3	(Spain) M Granollers (Spain) M López	w/o
(India) R Bopanna (India) L Paes	3	2
2	(Croatia) I Dodig (Brazil) M Melo	6	6

Semifinals
LL	(France) P-H Herbert (Poland) M Przysiężny	4	7^{7}	[10]
4	(United States) E Butorac (South Africa) R Klaasen	6	6^{2}	[7]
3	(Spain) M Granollers (Spain) M López	5	3
2	(Croatia) I Dodig (Brazil) M Melo	7	6

Final
LL	(France) P-H Herbert (Poland) M Przysiężny	6	6^{3}	[10]
2	(Croatia) I Dodig (Brazil) M Melo	3	7^{7}	[5]

== Qualifying ==
=== Seeds ===
1. (Kazakhstan) Andrey Golubev / (Uzbekistan) Denis Istomin (first round)
2. (Germany) Frank Moser / (Germany) Alexander Satschko (first round)

=== Qualifiers ===
1. (United Kingdom) Jamie Delgado / (Luxembourg) Gilles Müller

=== Lucky losers ===
1. (France) Pierre-Hugues Herbert / (Poland) Michał Przysiężny

=== Qualifying draw ===
First round
1	(Kazakhstan) Andrey Golubev (Uzbekistan) Denis Istomin	5	7^{7}	[4]
(France) Pierre-Hugues Herbert (Poland) Michał Przysiężny	7	6^{0}	[10]
(United Kingdom) Jamie Delgado (Luxembourg) Gilles Müller	4	7	[10]
2	(Germany) Frank Moser (Germany) Alexander Satschko	6	5	[8]

Qualifying competition
(France) Pierre-Hugues Herbert (Poland) Michał Przysiężny	6	1	[8]
(United Kingdom) Jamie Delgado (Luxembourg) Gilles Müller	3	6	[10]
