= 2023 Japan Open Tennis Championships =

- Date: 16–22 October
- Edition: 48th
- Category: ATP Tour 500
- Draw: 32S/16D
- Prize money: $2,013,940
- Surface: Hard / outdoor
- Location: Tokyo, Japan
- Venue: Ariake Coliseum

Champions

Singles
- (United States) Ben Shelton

Doubles
- (Australia) Rinky Hijikata / (Australia) Max Purcell
- Japan Open

The 2023 Japan Open Tennis Championships (also known as the Kinoshita Group Japan Open for sponsorship reasons) was a men's tennis tournament played on outdoor hardcourts. It was the 48th edition of the Japan Open, and was part of the ATP Tour 500 series of the 2023 ATP Tour. It was held at the Ariake Coliseum in Tokyo, Japan, from 16 October until 22 October 2023. Unseeded Ben Shelton won the singles title.

== Finals ==
=== Singles ===
- (United States) Ben Shelton defeated Aslan Karatsev, 7–5, 6–1

=== Doubles ===
- (Australia) Rinky Hijikata / (Australia) Max Purcell defeated (United Kingdom) Jamie Murray / (New Zealand) Michael Venus, 6–4, 6–1

== Singles main-draw entrants ==
=== Seeds ===
Country	Player	Rank^{1}	Seed
USA	Taylor Fritz	8	1
NOR	Casper Ruud	9	2
GER	Alexander Zverev	10	3
AUS	Alex de Minaur	11	4
USA	Tommy Paul	12	5
USA	Frances Tiafoe	13	6
	Karen Khachanov	14	7
CAN	Félix Auger-Aliassime	15	8

- ^{1} Rankings are as of 2 October 2023.

=== Other entrants ===
The following players received wildcards into the singles main draw:

- (Japan) Shintaro Mochizuki
- (Japan) Sho Shimabukuro
- (Japan) Yosuke Watanuki

The following players received entry from the qualifying draw:

- (Japan) Taro Daniel
- (United Kingdom) Jack Draper
- (Chile) Cristian Garín
- (United States) Marcos Giron

=== Withdrawals ===
- (United Kingdom) Andy Murray → replaced by (Austria) Sebastian Ofner
- (Japan) Kei Nishikori → replaced by (China) Zhang Zhizhen
- (Canada) Milos Raonic → replaced by (Australia) Christopher O'Connell

== Doubles main-draw entrants ==
=== Seeds ===
Country	Player	Country	Player	Rank^{1}	Seed
~~IND~~	~~Rohan Bopanna~~	~~AUS~~	~~Matthew Ebden~~	~~15~~	~~1~~
~~ESP~~	~~Marcel Granollers~~	~~ARG~~	~~Horacio Zeballos~~	~~27~~	~~2~~
ESA	Marcelo Arévalo	NED	Jean-Julien Rojer	33	3
BEL	Sander Gillé	BEL	Joran Vliegen	37	4

- Rankings are as of 2 October 2023.

=== Other entrants ===
The following pairs received wildcards into the doubles main draw:

- (Japan) Toshihide Matsui / (Japan) Kaito Uesugi
- (Japan) Sho Shimabukuro / (Japan) Yosuke Watanuki

The following pair received entry from the qualifying draw:

- (Japan) Taisei Ichikawa / (Japan) Masamichi Imamura

The following pairs received entry as lucky losers:

- (Japan) Shintaro Mochizuki / (Japan) Rio Noguchi
- (Japan) Kaichi Uchida / (Japan) Yasutaka Uchiyama

=== Withdrawals ===
- (India) Rohan Bopanna / (Australia) Matthew Ebden → replaced by (Japan) Kaichi Uchida / (Japan) Yasutaka Uchiyama
- (Spain) Marcel Granollers / (Argentina) Horacio Zeballos → replaced by (Japan) Shintaro Mochizuki / (Japan) Rio Noguchi
- (Monaco) Hugo Nys / (Poland) Jan Zieliński → replaced by (Japan) Ben McLachlan / (Japan) Yoshihito Nishioka
