= 1993 Japan Open Tennis Championships – Women's singles =

Women's singles
- 1993 Japan Open Tennis Championships

Final
- Champion: (Japan) Kimiko Date
- Runner-up: (Netherlands) Stephanie Rottier
- Score: 6–1, 6–3

Details
- Draw: 32 (2WC/4Q)
- Seeds: 8

Events
| Singles | men | women |
| Doubles | men | women |
- Japan Open

Kimiko Date was the defending champion and successfully defended her title, by defeating Stephanie Rottier 6–1, 6–3 in the final.

== Seeds ==
1. (Japan) Kimiko Date (champion)
2. (Japan) Naoko Sawamatsu (second round)
3. (United States) Pam Shriver (quarterfinals)
4. (Belgium) Sabine Appelmans (second round)
5. (United States) Patty Fendick (quarterfinals)
6. (Australia) Nicole Provis (semifinals)
7. (Germany) Wiltrud Probst (first round)
8. (Netherlands) Stephanie Rottier (final)

== Draw ==
Key

- Q = Qualifier
- WC = Wild card
- LL = Lucky loser
- Alt = Alternate
- ITF = ITF entry
- PR = Protected ranking
- SR = Special ranking
- SE = Special exempt
- JE = Junior exempt
- JR = Junior Accelerator Programme entrant
- CO = College Accelerator Programme entrant
- NG = Next Gen Accelerator Program entrant
- w/o = Walkover
- r = Retired
- d = Defaulted

=== Finals ===
Semifinals
1 | (Japan) Kimiko Date | 6 | 6
6 | (Australia) Nicole Provis | 3 | 1
8 | (Netherlands) Stephanie Rottier | 6 | 6
(Japan) Mana Endo | 4 | 2

Final
1 | (Japan) Kimiko Date | 6 | 6
8 | (Netherlands) Stephanie Rottier | 1 | 3

=== Top half ===
First round
1 | (Japan) K Date | 7^{7} | 6^{6} | 7
(France) S Testud | 6^{1} | 7^{8} | 5
(China) F Li | 6 | 6
Q | (Japan) M Yanagi | 0 | 3
(United Kingdom) M Javer | 4 | 5
(Netherlands) M Oremans | 6 | 7
(Japan) K Nagatsuka | 6 | 7
7 | (Germany) W Probst | 2 | 5
3 | (United States) P Shriver | 6 | 6
(United States) M Werdel | 4 | 4
(Slovakia) K Habšudová | 5 | 6 | 3
Q | (United States) A Henricksson | 7 | 3 | 6
WC | (Japan) Y Kamio | 1 | 3
(Japan) A Sugiyama | 6 | 6
(Japan) R Hiraki | 6 | 4 | 4
6 | (Australia) N Provis | 4 | 6 | 6

Second round
1 | (Japan) K Date | 6 | 6
(China) F Li | 0 | 0
(Netherlands) M Oremans | 6^{3} | 6 | 7
(Japan) K Nagatsuka | 7^{7} | 0 | 5
3 | (United States) P Shriver | 6
Q | (United States) A Henricksson | 1 | r
(Japan) A Sugiyama | 4 | 0
6 | (Australia) N Provis | 6 | 6

Quarterfinals
1 | (Japan) K Date | 6 | 4 | 6
(Netherlands) M Oremans | 3 | 6 | 3
3 | (United States) P Shriver | 3 | 3
6 | (Australia) N Provis | 6 | 6

Semifinals
1 | (Japan) K Date | 6 | 6
6 | (Australia) N Provis | 3 | 1

=== Bottom half ===
First round
8 | (Netherlands) S Rottier | 6 | 4 | 6
(France) P Paradis-Mangon | 4 | 6 | 1
Q | (Japan) M Miyauchi | 6 | 6
(Czech Republic) E Švíglerová | 4 | 2
(Finland) P Thorén | 1 | 3
(Australia) M Jaggard-Lai | 6 | 6
(United States) C Cunningham | 4 | 0
4 | (Belgium) S Appelmans | 6 | 6
5 | (United States) P Fendick | 7 | 7^{7}
(Japan) N Miyagi | 5 | 6^{4}
(Czech Republic) A Strnadová | 6^{3} | 0
(Indonesia) Y Basuki | 7^{7} | 6
Q | (Japan) Y Yoshida | 1 | 4
(Japan) M Endo | 6 | 6
WC | (Japan) M Donoshiro | 3 | 3
2 | (Japan) N Sawamatsu | 6 | 6

Second round
8 | (Netherlands) S Rottier | 7^{7} | 6
Q | (Japan) M Miyauchi | 6^{3} | 2
(Australia) M Jaggard-Lai | 6 | 6
4 | (Belgium) S Appelmans | 2 | 2
5 | (United States) P Fendick | 6 | 6
(Indonesia) Y Basuki | 1 | 2
(Japan) M Endo | 6 | 6^{5} | 6
2 | (Japan) N Sawamatsu | 3 | 7^{7} | 4

Quarterfinals
8 | (Netherlands) S Rottier | 6 | 6
(Australia) M Jaggard-Lai | 3 | 3
5 | (United States) P Fendick | 4 | 5
(Japan) M Endo | 6 | 7

Semifinals
8 | (Netherlands) S Rottier | 6 | 6
(Japan) M Endo | 4 | 2
