= 2023 Japan Open Tennis Championships – Doubles =

Doubles
- 2023 Japan Open Tennis Championships

Final
- Champions: (Australia) Rinky Hijikata (Australia) Max Purcell
- Runners-up: (United Kingdom) Jamie Murray (New Zealand) Michael Venus
- Score: 6–4, 6–1

Events
Singles	Doubles
← 2022 ·	Japan Open	· 2024 →

Rinky Hijikata and Max Purcell defeated Jamie Murray and Michael Venus in the final, 6–4, 6–1 to win the doubles tennis title at the 2023 Japan Open.

Mackenzie McDonald and Marcelo Melo were the defending champions, but lost in the first round to Sander Gillé and Joran Vliegen.

== Seeds ==
1. (India) Rohan Bopanna / (Australia) Matthew Ebden (withdrew)
2. (Spain) Marcel Granollers / (Argentina) Horacio Zeballos (withdrew)
3. (El Salvador) Marcelo Arévalo / (Netherlands) Jean-Julien Rojer (semifinals)
4. (Belgium) Sander Gillé / (Belgium) Joran Vliegen (quarterfinals)

== Draw ==
=== Key ===
- Q = Qualifier
- WC = Wild card
- LL = Lucky loser
- Alt = Alternate
- SE = Special exempt
- PR = Protected ranking
- ITF = ITF entry
- JE = Junior exempt
- w/o = Walkover
- r = Retired
- d = Defaulted
- SR = Special ranking

=== Draw ===
First round
LL	(Japan) K Uchida (Japan) Y Uchiyama	6	6
(Argentina) F Cerúndolo (Argentina) TM Etcheverry	0	1
(United States) N Lammons (United States) J Withrow	7^{7}	3	[10]
WC	(Japan) T Matsui (Japan) K Uesugi	6^{2}	6	[7]
4	(Belgium) S Gillé (Belgium) J Vliegen	7	7^{7}
(United States) M McDonald (Brazil) M Melo	5	6^{5}
LL	(Japan) S Watanabe (Japan) T Yuzuki	2	7^{10}	[3]
(United Kingdom) J Murray (New Zealand) M Venus	6	6^{8}	[10]
Q	(Japan) T Ichikawa (Japan) M Imamura	3	7^{7}	[7]
(Japan) B McLachlan (Japan) Y Nishioka	6	6^{5}	[10]
(Austria) A Erler (Austria) L Miedler	4	4
3	(El Salvador) M Arévalo (Netherlands) J-J Rojer	6	6
(Croatia) N Mektić (Australia) J Peers	4	2
WC	(Japan) S Shimabukuro (Japan) Y Watanuki	6	6
(Australia) R Hijikata (Australia) M Purcell	5	7^{7}	[10]
LL	(Japan) S Mochizuki (Japan) R Noguchi	7	6^{4}	[5]

Quarterfinals
LL	(Japan) K Uchida (Japan) Y Uchiyama	3	4
(United States) N Lammons (United States) J Withrow	6	6
4	(Belgium) S Gillé (Belgium) J Vliegen	6	5	[5]
(United Kingdom) J Murray (New Zealand) M Venus	4	7	[10]
(Japan) B McLachlan (Japan) Y Nishioka	3	6^{3}
3	(El Salvador) M Arévalo (Netherlands) J-J Rojer	6	7^{7}
WC	(Japan) S Shimabukuro (Japan) Y Watanuki	6^{6}	4
(Australia) R Hijikata (Australia) M Purcell	7^{8}	6

Semifinals
(United States) N Lammons (United States) J Withrow	6^{5}	6	[12]
(United Kingdom) J Murray (New Zealand) M Venus	7^{7}	2	[14]
3	(El Salvador) M Arévalo (Netherlands) J-J Rojer	6	3	[4]
(Australia) R Hijikata (Australia) M Purcell	3	6	[10]

Final
(United Kingdom) J Murray (New Zealand) M Venus	4	1
(Australia) R Hijikata (Australia) M Purcell	6	6

== Qualifying ==
=== Seeds ===
1. (Japan) Kaichi Uchida / (Japan) Yasutaka Uchiyama (first round, lucky losers)
2. (Japan) Seita Watanabe / (Japan) Takeru Yuzuki (first round, lucky losers)

=== Qualifiers ===
1. (Japan) Taisei Ichikawa / (Japan) Masamichi Imamura

=== Lucky losers ===
1. (Japan) Kaichi Uchida / (Japan) Yasutaka Uchiyama
2. (Japan) Shintaro Mochizuki / (Japan) Rio Noguchi
3. (Japan) Seita Watanabe / (Japan) Takeru Yuzuki

=== Qualifying draw ===
First round
1/WC	(Japan) Kaichi Uchida (Japan) Yasutaka Uchiyama	7^{7}	6^{4}	[4]
Alt	(Japan) Shintaro Mochizuki (Japan) Rio Noguchi	6^{5}	7^{7}	[10]
(Japan) Taisei Ichikawa (Japan) Masamichi Imamura	4	6	[10]
2	(Japan) Seita Watanabe (Japan) Takeru Yuzuki	6	3	[8]

Qualifying competition
Alt	(Japan) Shintaro Mochizuki (Japan) Rio Noguchi	5	4
(Japan) Taisei Ichikawa (Japan) Masamichi Imamura	7	6
