= 2024 Japan Open Tennis Championships – Singles =

Singles
- 2024 Japan Open Tennis Championships

Final
- Champion: (France) Arthur Fils
- Runner-up: (France) Ugo Humbert
- Score: 5–7, 7–6^{(8–6)}, 6–3

Details
- Draw: 32 (4Q / 3WC)
- Seeds: 8

Events
| Singles | Doubles |
| ← 2023 · | Japan Open | · 2025 → |

Arthur Fils defeated Ugo Humbert in the final, 5–7, 7–6^{(8–6)}, 6–3 to win the singles tennis title at the 2024 Japan Open. He saved a championship point en route to his third ATP Tour title (and first on hardcourt). Humbert was contending to become the first player in ATP Tour history to win his first seven finals.

Ben Shelton was the defending champion, but lost in the quarterfinals to Fils.

== Seeds ==
1. (United States) Taylor Fritz (first round)
2. (Poland) Hubert Hurkacz (second round)
3. (Norway) Casper Ruud (first round)
4. (Greece) Stefanos Tsitsipas (first round)
5. (United States) Tommy Paul (second round)
6. (Denmark) Holger Rune (semifinals)
7. (United States) Frances Tiafoe (first round)
8. (United States) Ben Shelton (quarterfinals)

== Draw ==
=== Key ===
- Q = Qualifier
- WC = Wild card
- LL = Lucky loser
- Alt = Alternate
- ITF = ITF entry
- PR = Protected ranking
- SR = Special ranking
- SE = Special exempt
- JE = Junior exempt
- JR = Junior Accelerator Programme entrant
- CO = College Accelerator Programme entrant
- NG = Next Gen Accelerator Program entrant
- w/o = Walkover
- r = Retired
- d = Defaulted

=== Finals ===
Semifinals
(France) Arthur Fils | 7^{10} | 7^{12}
6 | (Denmark) Holger Rune | 6^{8} | 6^{10}
(Czech Republic) Tomáš Macháč | 3 | 6 | 2
(France) Ugo Humbert | 6 | 3 | 6

Final
(France) Arthur Fils | 5 | 7^{8} | 6
(France) Ugo Humbert | 7 | 6^{6} | 3

=== Top half ===
First round
1 | (United States) T Fritz | 4 | 6 | 3
(France) A Fils | 6 | 3 | 6
Q | (Netherlands) B van de Zandschulp | 3 | 4
(Italy) M Berrettini | 6 | 6
(Argentina) M Navone | 6 | 6
(Italy) L Darderi | 4 | 4
PR | (United States) R Opelka | 6 | 1 | 4
8 | (United States) B Shelton | 3 | 6 | 6
3 | (Norway) C Ruud | 6^{5} | 1
(Australia) J Thompson | 7^{7} | 6
PR | (Croatia) M Čilić | 4 | 6 | 3
WC | (Japan) K Nishikori | 6 | 3 | 6
(Canada) F Auger-Aliassime | 6^{5} | 6 | 6^{5}
WC | (Japan) Y Nishioka | 7^{7} | 3 | 7^{7}
(Chile) A Tabilo | 2 | 7 | 4
6 | (Denmark) H Rune | 6 | 5 | 6

Second round
(France) A Fils | 6^{5} | 0
(Italy) M Berrettini | 7^{7} | 0^{r}
(Argentina) M Navone | 4 | 3
8 | (United States) B Shelton | 6 | 6
(Australia) J Thompson | 2 | 3
WC | (Japan) K Nishikori | 6 | 6
WC | (Japan) Y Nishioka | 2 | 4
6 | (Denmark) H Rune | 6 | 6

Quarterfinals
(France) A Fils | 7 | 6^{5} | 7^{7}
8 | (United States) B Shelton | 5 | 7^{7} | 6^{2}
WC | (Japan) K Nishikori | 6 | 2 | 5
6 | (Denmark) H Rune | 3 | 6 | 7

Semifinals
(France) A Fils | 7^{10} | 7^{12}
6 | (Denmark) H Rune | 6^{8} | 6^{10}

=== Bottom half ===
First round
5 | (United States) T Paul | 6 | 6
(Italy) M Arnaldi | 3 | 2
(Australia) A Popyrin | 3 | 7^{7} | 5
(Czech Republic) T Macháč | 6 | 6^{5} | 7
(Argentina) TM Etcheverry | 4 | 6^{5}
Q | (Australia) C O'Connell | 6 | 7^{7}
Q | (United States) A Michelsen | 4 | 6 | 6
4 | (Greece) S Tsitsipas | 6 | 1 | 2
7 | (United States) F Tiafoe | 5 | 3
SE | (United States) B Nakashima | 7 | 6
WC | (Japan) S Mochizuki | 1 | 2
(France) U Humbert | 6 | 6
(United Kingdom) J Draper | 6 | 6
Q | (Italy) M Bellucci | 4 | 2
(United States) M Giron | 4 | 7^{7} | 4
2 | (Poland) H Hurkacz | 6 | 6^{5} | 6

Second round
5 | (United States) T Paul | 6 | 3 | 6^{4}
(Czech Republic) T Macháč | 2 | 6 | 7^{7}
Q | (Australia) C O'Connell | 1 | 4
Q | (United States) A Michelsen | 6 | 6
SE | (United States) B Nakashima | 3 | 2
(France) U Humbert | 6 | 6
(United Kingdom) J Draper | 6 | 6
2 | (Poland) H Hurkacz | 4 | 4

Quarterfinals
(Czech Republic) T Macháč | 7^{7} | 6
Q | (United States) A Michelsen | 6^{2} | 3
(France) U Humbert | 7 | 2
(United Kingdom) J Draper | 5 | 1^{r}

Semifinals
(Czech Republic) T Macháč | 3 | 6 | 2
(France) U Humbert | 6 | 3 | 6

== Qualifying ==
=== Seeds ===
1. (United States) Alex Michelsen (qualified)
2. (Netherlands) Botic van de Zandschulp (qualified)
3. (France) Alexandre Müller (first round)
4. (United States) Aleksandar Kovacevic (first round)
5. (Australia) Christopher O'Connell (qualified)
6. (Australia) Rinky Hijikata (qualifying competition)
7. (Bosnia and Herzegovina) Damir Džumhur (first round)
8. (Italy) Luca Nardi (qualifying competition)

=== Qualifiers ===
1. (United States) Alex Michelsen
2. (Netherlands) Botic van de Zandschulp
3. (Italy) Mattia Bellucci
4. (Australia) Christopher O'Connell

=== Qualifying draw ===
==== First qualifier ====
First round
1 | (United States) Alex Michelsen | 6 | 6
WC | (Japan) Yasutaka Uchiyama | 3 | 4
(Croatia) Borna Ćorić | 6 | 6
7 | (Bosnia and Herzegovina) Damir Džumhur | 3 | 4

Qualifying competition
1 | (United States) Alex Michelsen | 6 | 6
(Croatia) Borna Ćorić | 3 | 3

==== Second qualifier ====
First round
2 | (Netherlands) Botic van de Zandschulp | 2 | 6 | 6
WC | (Japan) Yosuke Watanuki | 6 | 3 | 1
WC | (Japan) Rei Sakamoto | 3 | 1
8 | (Italy) Luca Nardi | 6 | 6

Qualifying competition
2 | (Netherlands) Botic van de Zandschulp | 6 | 6
8 | (Italy) Luca Nardi | 2 | 3

==== Third qualifier ====
First round
3 | (France) Alexandre Müller | 6 | 2 | 6^{3}
Alt | (Italy) Mattia Bellucci | 4 | 6 | 7^{7}
(Australia) Aleksandar Vukic | 6^{2} | 7^{7} | 6^{3}
6 | (Australia) Rinky Hijikata | 7^{7} | 6^{1} | 7^{7}

Qualifying competition
Alt | (Italy) Mattia Bellucci | 6 | 6
6 | (Australia) Rinky Hijikata | 3 | 1

==== Fourth qualifier ====
First round
4 | (United States) Aleksandar Kovacevic | 3 | 7^{7} | 6^{4}
(Japan) Taro Daniel | 6 | 6^{4} | 7^{7}
Alt | (Finland) Otto Virtanen | 4 | 4
5 | (Australia) Christopher O'Connell | 6 | 6

Qualifying competition
(Japan) Taro Daniel | 3 | 5
5 | (Australia) Christopher O'Connell | 6 | 7
