= 1991 Suntory Japan Open Tennis Championships – Men's doubles =

Men's doubles
- 1991 Suntory Japan Open Tennis Championships

Final
- Champion: (Sweden) Stefan Edberg; (Australia) Todd Woodbridge
- Runner-up: (Australia) John Fitzgerald; (Sweden) Anders Järryd
- Score: 6–4, 5–7, 6–4

Details
- Draw: 28 (2Q)
- Seeds: 8

Events
Singles	men	women
Doubles	men	women
- Japan Open

Mark Kratzmann and Wally Masur were the defending champions, but competed this year with different partners. Kratzmann teamed up with Pat Cash and lost in the first round to Ivan Lendl and Shuzo Matsuoka, while Masur teamed up with Jason Stoltenberg and lost in the first round to Scott Melville and Jan Siemerink.

Stefan Edberg and Todd Woodbridge won the title, defeating John Fitzgerald and Anders Järryd in the final, 6–4, 5–7, 6–4.

== Seeds ==
The top four seeds received a bye into the second round.

1. (United States) Scott Davis / (United States) David Pate (second round)
2. (Germany) Udo Riglewski / (Germany) Michael Stich (second round)
3. (United States) Rick Leach / (United States) Jim Pugh (quarterfinals)
4. (Canada) Grant Connell / (Canada) Glenn Michibata (second round)
5. (United States) Patrick Galbraith / (United States) Todd Witsken (second round)
6. (United States) Jim Courier / (Switzerland) Jakob Hlasek (semifinals)
7. (United States) Jim Grabb / (South Africa) Gary Muller (quarterfinals)
8. (United Kingdom) Jeremy Bates / (United States) Kelly Jones (first round)

== Draw ==
Key

- Q = Qualifier
- WC = Wild card
- LL = Lucky loser
- Alt = Alternate
- ITF = ITF entry
- PR = Protected ranking
- SR = Special ranking
- SE = Special exempt
- JE = Junior exempt
- JR = Junior Accelerator Programme entrant
- CO = College Accelerator Programme entrant
- NG = Next Gen Accelerator Program entrant
- w/o = Walkover
- r = Retired
- d = Defaulted

=== Finals ===
Semifinals
(Czechoslovakia) Milan Šrejber (Czechoslovakia) Daniel Vacek	3	4
(Sweden) Stefan Edberg (Australia) Todd Woodbridge	6	6
6	(United States) Jim Courier (Switzerland) Jakob Hlasek	4	6	1
(Australia) John Fitzgerald (Sweden) Anders Järryd	6	3	6

Final
(Sweden) Stefan Edberg (Australia) Todd Woodbridge	6	5	6
(Australia) John Fitzgerald (Sweden) Anders Järryd	4	7	4

=== Top half ===
First round
(United States) K Kinnear (United States) S Salumaa	7	6	4
(Czechoslovakia) M Šrejber (Czechoslovakia) D Vacek	5	7	6
Q	(Israel) G Bloom (United States) G Layendecker	7	4	7
(United States) T Nelson (United States) S Patridge	6	6	6
(United States) J Canter (New Zealand) B Derlin	6	2	7
8	(United Kingdom) J Bates (United States) K Jones	4	6	6
(United Kingdom) A Castle (Socialist Federal Republic of Yugoslavia) S Živojinović	5	4
(United Kingdom) N Brown (Netherlands) M Oosting	7	6
(Sweden) S Edberg (Australia) T Woodbridge	6	7
Q	(Soviet Union) Ģ Dzelde (Netherlands) J Eltingh	4	6
(Japan) E Furusho (Japan) T Sato	6	3
5	(United States) P Galbraith (United States) T Witsken	7	6

Second round
1	(United States) S Davis (United States) D Pate	4	6	4
(Czechoslovakia) M Šrejber (Czechoslovakia) D Vacek	6	4	6
Q	(Israel) G Bloom (United States) G Layendecker	4	6	6
(United States) J Canter (New Zealand) B Derlin	6	2	3
3	(United States) R Leach (United States) J Pugh	7	6
(United Kingdom) N Brown (Netherlands) M Oosting	5	4
(Sweden) S Edberg (Australia) T Woodbridge	6	4	6
5	(United States) P Galbraith (United States) T Witsken	4	6	0

Quarterfinals
(Czechoslovakia) M Šrejber (Czechoslovakia) D Vacek	3	7	6
Q	(Israel) G Bloom (United States) G Layendecker	6	5	3
3	(United States) R Leach (United States) J Pugh	7	6	3
(Sweden) S Edberg (Australia) T Woodbridge	6	7	6

Semifinals
(Czechoslovakia) M Šrejber (Czechoslovakia) D Vacek	3	4
(Sweden) S Edberg (Australia) T Woodbridge	6	6

=== Bottom half ===
First round
6	(United States) J Courier (Switzerland) J Hlasek	6	7
(New Zealand) K Evernden (United States) J Rive	2	6
(United Kingdom) N Broad (United States) K Curren	6	4	6
(United States) B Garrow (United States) B Shelton	3	6	2
(Australia) P Cash (Australia) M Kratzmann	2	4
(Czechoslovakia) I Lendl (Japan) S Matsuoka	6	6
7	(United States) J Grabb (South Africa) G Muller	4	6	6
(South Africa) S Kruger (South Africa) C Van Rensburg	6	3	4
(United States) S Melville (Netherlands) J Siemerink	6	7
(Australia) W Masur (Australia) J Stoltenberg	3	5
(Japan) H Tanizawa (Japan) Y Yamamoto	1	4
(Australia) J Fitzgerald (Sweden) A Järryd	6	6

Second round
6	(United States) J Courier (Switzerland) J Hlasek	6	6
(United Kingdom) N Broad (United States) K Curren	3	3
(Czechoslovakia) I Lendl (Japan) S Matsuoka	7	6
4	(Canada) G Connell (Canada) G Michibata	5	4
7	(United States) J Grabb (South Africa) G Muller	7	7
(United States) S Melville (Netherlands) J Siemerink	6	5
(Australia) J Fitzgerald (Sweden) A Järryd	6	7
2	(Germany) U Riglewski (Germany) M Stich	1	5

Quarterfinals
6	(United States) J Courier (Switzerland) J Hlasek	6	7
(Czechoslovakia) I Lendl (Japan) S Matsuoka	3	6
7	(United States) J Grabb (South Africa) G Muller	3	6	1
(Australia) J Fitzgerald (Sweden) A Järryd	6	3	6

Semifinals
6	(United States) J Courier (Switzerland) J Hlasek	4	6	1
(Australia) J Fitzgerald (Sweden) A Järryd	6	3	6
