= 2014 Rakuten Japan Open Tennis Championships – Singles =

Singles
- 2014 Rakuten Japan Open Tennis Championships

Final
- Champion: (Japan) Kei Nishikori
- Runner-up: (Canada) Milos Raonic
- Score: 7–6^{(7–5)}, 4–6, 6–4

Details
- Draw: 32 (4Q / 3WC)
- Seeds: 8

Events
Singles	Doubles
← 2013 ·	Japan Open	· 2015 →

Juan Martín del Potro was the defending champion, but withdrew with a wrist injury.

Kei Nishikori won the title, defeating Milos Raonic in the final, 7–6^{(7–5)}, 4–6, 6–4.

== Seeds ==
1. (Switzerland) Stan Wawrinka (first round)
2. (Spain) David Ferrer (first round)
3. (Canada) Milos Raonic (final)
4. (Japan) Kei Nishikori (champion)
5. (France) Jo-Wilfried Tsonga (first round)
6. (Spain) Roberto Bautista Agut (first round, retired)
7. (South Africa) Kevin Anderson (second round)
8. (Ukraine) Alexandr Dolgopolov (first round)

== Draw ==
=== Key ===
- Q = Qualifier
- WC = Wild card
- LL = Lucky loser
- Alt = Alternate
- SE = Special exempt
- PR = Protected ranking
- ITF = ITF entry
- JE = Junior exempt
- w/o = Walkover
- r = Retired
- d = Defaulted
- SR = Special ranking

=== Finals ===
Semifinals
(Germany) Benjamin Becker	6	0	6^{2}
4	(Japan) Kei Nishikori	4	6	7^{7}
3	(Canada) Milos Raonic	6	6
(France) Gilles Simon	1	4

Final
4	(Japan) Kei Nishikori	7^{7}	4	6
3	(Canada) Milos Raonic	6^{5}	6	4

=== Top half ===
First round
1	(Switzerland) S Wawrinka	5	2
WC	(Japan) T Ito	7	6
(Germany) B Becker	7	4
(Finland) J Nieminen	5	1^{r}
Q	(France) P-H Herbert	4	4
(Kazakhstan) A Golubev	6	6
(United States) J Sock	6	6
8	(Ukraine) A Dolgopolov	4	1
4	(Japan) K Nishikori	6	6
(Croatia) I Dodig	3	4
WC	(Japan) G Soeda	2	4
(United States) D Young	6	6
Q	(United States) R Ram	5	7	4
(France) J Chardy	7	5	6
(Austria) D Thiem	6^{5}	4
7	(South Africa) K Anderson	7^{7}	6

Second round
WC	(Japan) T Ito	3	3
(Germany) B Becker	6	6
(Kazakhstan) A Golubev	3	6	5
(United States) J Sock	6	1	7
4	(Japan) K Nishikori	6	7^{7}
(United States) D Young	4	6^{4}
(France) J Chardy	6	6
7	(South Africa) K Anderson	4	4

Quarterfinals
(Germany) B Becker	4	6	6
(United States) J Sock	6	1	4
4	(Japan) K Nishikori	6	6
(France) J Chardy	4	2

Semifinals
(Germany) B Becker	6	0	6^{2}
4	(Japan) K Nishikori	4	6	7^{7}

=== Bottom half ===
First round
5	(France) J-W Tsonga	6	5	6^{9}
Q	(Poland) M Przysiężny	4	7	7^{11}
WC	(Japan) T Daniel	6^{2}	7^{7}	5
(Uzbekistan) D Istomin	7^{7}	6^{5}	7
(France) É Roger-Vasselin	5	1^{r}
(Austria) J Melzer	7	4
(Australia) B Tomic	6^{3}	3
3	(Canada) M Raonic	7^{7}	6
6	(Spain) R Bautista Agut	6	6^{7}	1^{r}
(France) G Simon	4	7^{9}	2
(Argentina) F Delbonis	3	4
(Luxembourg) G Müller	6	6
Q	(Japan) H Moriya	6^{4}	2
(United States) S Johnson	7^{7}	6
(Spain) M Granollers	4	6	6
2	(Spain) D Ferrer	6	4	4

Second round
Q	(Poland) M Przysiężny	4	6^{5}
(Uzbekistan) D Istomin	6	7^{7}
(Austria) J Melzer	4	3
3	(Canada) M Raonic	6	6
(France) G Simon	4	7^{7}	6
(Luxembourg) G Müller	6	6^{1}	3
(United States) S Johnson	4	6	6
(Spain) M Granollers	6	3	4

Quarterfinals
(Uzbekistan) D Istomin	6^{8}	3
3	(Canada) M Raonic	7^{10}	6
(France) G Simon	7^{7}	6
(United States) S Johnson	6^{4}	1

Semifinals
3	(Canada) M Raonic	6	6
(France) G Simon	1	4

== Qualifying ==
=== Seeds ===
1. (United Kingdom) James Ward (qualifying competition, retired)
2. (France) Pierre-Hugues Herbert (qualified)
3. (Australia) James Duckworth (qualifying competition)
4. (Poland) Michał Przysiężny (qualified)
5. (United States) Rajeev Ram (qualified)
6. (Japan) Hiroki Moriya (qualified)
7. (Australia) Thanasi Kokkinakis (qualifying competition)
8. (Japan) Yasutaka Uchiyama (qualifying competition)

=== Qualifiers ===
1. (United States) Rajeev Ram
2. (France) Pierre-Hugues Herbert
3. (Japan) Hiroki Moriya
4. (Poland) Michał Przysiężny

=== Qualifying draw ===
==== First qualifier ====
First round
1	(United Kingdom) James Ward	6	7^{7}
(Japan) Toshihide Matsui	3	6^{3}
WC	(Japan) Yusuke Takahashi	3	6^{5}
5	(United States) Rajeev Ram	6	7^{7}

Qualifying competition
1	(United Kingdom) James Ward	2	1^{r}
5	(United States) Rajeev Ram	6	4

==== Second qualifier ====
First round
2	(France) Pierre-Hugues Herbert	7^{7}	6
(Japan) Shuichi Sekiguchi	6^{5}	3
WC	(Japan) Naoki Nakagawa	1	6	3
8	(Japan) Yasutaka Uchiyama	6	3	6

Qualifying competition
2	(France) Pierre-Hugues Herbert	6^{4}	6	6
8	(Japan) Yasutaka Uchiyama	7^{7}	2	4

==== Third qualifier ====
First round
3	(Australia) James Duckworth	7	6
(Japan) Bumpei Sato	5	1
WC	(Japan) Takao Suzuki	4	7^{8}	3
6	(Japan) Hiroki Moriya	6	6^{6}	6

Qualifying competition
3	(Australia) James Duckworth	7	5	3
6	(Japan) Hiroki Moriya	5	7	6

==== Fourth qualifier ====
First round
4	(Poland) Michał Przysiężny	6	6
(Japan) Yusuke Watanuki	3	2
(South Korea) Jun Woong-sun	0	2
7	(Australia) Thanasi Kokkinakis	6	6

Qualifying competition
4	(Poland) Michał Przysiężny	7^{7}	7^{7}
7	(Australia) Thanasi Kokkinakis	6^{4}	6^{1}
