= 1993 Japan Open Tennis Championships – Men's doubles =

Men's doubles
- 1993 Japan Open Tennis Championships

Final
- Champions: (United States) Ken Flach (United States) Rick Leach
- Runners-up: (Canada) Glenn Michibata (United States) David Pate
- Score: 2–6, 6–3, 6–4

Details
- Draw: 28 (2Q / 2WC)
- Seeds: 8

Events
Singles	men	women
Doubles	men	women
- Japan Open

Kelly Jones and Rick Leach were the defending champions, but competed this year with different partners.

Jones teamed up with Paul Annacone and lost in the second round to Scott Davis and Jared Palmer.

Leach teamed up with Ken Flach and successfully defended his title, by defeating Glenn Michibata and David Pate 2–6, 6–3, 6–4 in the final.

== Seeds ==
The first four seeds received a bye to the second round.

1. (Australia) Mark Kratzmann / (Australia) Wally Masur (quarterfinals)
2. (United States) Patrick McEnroe / (United States) Jonathan Stark (second round)
3. (United States) Brad Pearce / (South Africa) Byron Talbot (second round)
4. (Germany) Patrik Kühnen / (Italy) Diego Nargiso (second round)
5. (United States) Ken Flach / (United States) Rick Leach (champion)
6. (United States) Mark Keil / (United States) Dave Randall (first round)
7. (Germany) Neil Broad / (South Africa) Gary Muller (first round)
8. (Canada) Glenn Michibata / (United States) David Pate (final)

== Draw ==
Key

- Q = Qualifier
- WC = Wild card
- LL = Lucky loser
- Alt = Alternate
- ITF = ITF entry
- PR = Protected ranking
- SR = Special ranking
- SE = Special exempt
- JE = Junior exempt
- JR = Junior Accelerator Programme entrant
- CO = College Accelerator Programme entrant
- NG = Next Gen Accelerator Program entrant
- w/o = Walkover
- r = Retired
- d = Defaulted

=== Finals ===
Semifinals
8	(Canada) Glenn Michibata (United States) David Pate	6	2	6
(United States) David Wheaton (Australia) Todd Woodbridge	3	6	4
5	(United States) Ken Flach (United States) Rick Leach	6	6
(United States) Scott Davis (United States) Jared Palmer	3	3

Final
8	(Canada) Glenn Michibata (United States) David Pate	6	3	4
5	(United States) Ken Flach (United States) Rick Leach	2	6	6

=== Top half ===
First round
(Czech Republic) M Damm (New Zealand) B Steven	6	6
(Japan) T Mori (Japan) T Sato	4	4
(Germany) D Prinosil (United States) K Thorne	3	5
(Australia) J Stoltenberg (Australia) S Stolle	6	7
WC	(Japan) E Furusho (Japan) T Shimada	5	5
8	(Canada) G Michibata (United States) D Pate	7	7
(United States) D Wheaton (Australia) T Woodbridge	6	7
(Australia) N Borwick (Australia) S Youl	3	6
WC	(Japan) S Matsuoka (Canada) G Rusedski	6	5
(Sweden) R Bergh (United States) T Kronemann	7	7
(Sweden) H Holm (Norway) BO Pedersen	5	6	7
6	(United States) M Keil (United States) D Randall	7	4	6

Second round
1	(Australia) M Kratzmann (Australia) W Masur	7	7
(Czech Republic) M Damm (New Zealand) B Steven	6	6
(Australia) J Stoltenberg (Australia) S Stolle	4	4
8	(Canada) G Michibata (United States) D Pate	6	6
4	(Germany) P Kühnen (Italy) D Nargiso	3	2
(United States) D Wheaton (Australia) T Woodbridge	6	6
(Sweden) R Bergh (United States) T Kronemann	4	6	6
(Sweden) H Holm (Norway) BO Pedersen	6	0	3

Quarterfinals
1	(Australia) M Kratzmann (Australia) W Masur	4	4
8	(Canada) G Michibata (United States) D Pate	6	6
(United States) D Wheaton (Australia) T Woodbridge	7	4	7
(Sweden) R Bergh (United States) T Kronemann	6	6	6

Semifinals
8	(Canada) G Michibata (United States) D Pate	6	2	6
(United States) D Wheaton (Australia) T Woodbridge	3	6	4

=== Bottom half ===
First round
5	(United States) K Flach (United States) R Leach	7	6	6
(South Africa) JL de Jager (South Africa) C van Rensburg	6	7	0
(United States) B Gilbert (United States) P Sampras	3	5
(United Kingdom) J Bates (Zimbabwe) B Black	6	7
(Netherlands) T Kempers (Netherlands) J Siemerink	3	7	6
Q	(United States) R Matuszewski (United States) J Sullivan	6	6	0
7	(United Kingdom) N Broad (South Africa) G Muller	6	4	4
(United States) P Annacone (United States) K Jones	2	6	6
(United States) K Kinnear (United States) S Salumaa	6	2
(United States) S Davis (United States) J Palmer	7	6
(United States) L Jensen (United States) M Jensen	3	3
Q	(United States) B Devening (United States) A O'Brien	6	6

Second round
5	(United States) K Flach (United States) R Leach	6	6	7
(United Kingdom) J Bates (Zimbabwe) B Black	4	7	6
(Netherlands) T Kempers (Netherlands) J Siemerink	2	7	7
3	(United States) B Pearce (South Africa) B Talbot	6	5	6
(United States) P Annacone (United States) K Jones	5	6	4
(United States) S Davis (United States) J Palmer	7	2	6
Q	(United States) B Devening (United States) A O'Brien	5	6	7
2	(United States) P McEnroe (United States) J Stark	7	2	6

Quarterfinals
5	(United States) K Flach (United States) R Leach	6	7
(Netherlands) T Kempers (Netherlands) J Siemerink	4	5
(United States) S Davis (United States) J Palmer	6	6
Q	(United States) B Devening (United States) A O'Brien	1	2

Semifinals
5	(United States) K Flach (United States) R Leach	6	6
(United States) S Davis (United States) J Palmer	3	3
