= 1993 Lipton Championships – Women's singles =

Women's singles
- 1993 Lipton Championships

Final
- Champion: (Spain) Arantxa Sánchez Vicario
- Runner-up: (Germany) Steffi Graf
- Score: 6–4, 3–6, 6–3

Details
- Draw: 96
- Seeds: 32

Events
| Singles | men | women |
| Doubles | men | women |
| ← 1992 · | Miami Open | · 1994 → |

Defending champion Arantxa Sánchez Vicario defeated Steffi Graf in the final, 6–4, 3–6, 6–3 to win the women's singles tennis title at the 1993 Miami Open.

== Seeds ==
All seeds receive a bye into the second round.

1. (Germany) Steffi Graf (final)
2. (Spain) Arantxa Sánchez Vicario (champion)
3. (Argentina) Gabriela Sabatini (semifinals)
4. (United States) Jennifer Capriati (third round)
5. (United States) Mary Joe Fernández (quarterfinals)
6. (Czech Republic) Jana Novotná (quarterfinals)
7. (Germany) Anke Huber (third round)
8. (France) Nathalie Tauziat (quarterfinals)
9. (South Africa) Amanda Coetzer (fourth round)
10. (Bulgaria) ~~Magdalena Maleeva~~ (withdrew)
11. (United States) Zina Garrison-Jackson (fourth round)
12. (France) Julie Halard (second round)
13. (United States) Lori McNeil (fourth round)
14. (Belarus) Natasha Zvereva (fourth round)
15. (Japan) Naoko Sawamatsu (second round)
16. (Japan) Kimiko Date (semifinals)
17. (United States) Pam Shriver (second round)
18. (Austria) Judith Wiesner (fourth round)
19. (United States) Gigi Fernández (third round)
20. (Georgia (country)) Leila Meskhi (quarterfinals)
21. (Canada) Patricia Hy (third round)
22. (Netherlands) Brenda Schultz (second round)
23. (Slovakia) Radomira Zrubáková (third round)
24. (Italy) Sandra Cecchini (second round)
25. (Germany) Barbara Rittner (third round)
26. (United States) Patty Fendick (fourth round)
27. (Germany) Sabine Hack (second round)
28. (Latvia) Larisa Neiland (third round)
29. (United States) Linda Harvey Wild (second round)
30. (Germany) Wiltrud Probst (second round)
31. (Croatia) Iva Majoli (second round)
32. (Argentina) Florencia Labat (third round)

== Draw ==
=== Key ===
- Q = Qualifier
- WC = Wild card
- LL = Lucky loser
- Alt = Alternate
- SE = Special exempt
- PR = Protected ranking
- ITF = ITF entry
- JE = Junior exempt
- w/o = Walkover
- r = Retired
- d = Defaulted
- SR = Special ranking

=== Finals ===
Quarterfinals
1 | (Germany) Steffi Graf | 6 | 6
8 | (France) Nathalie Tauziat | 1 | 0
3 | (Argentina) Gabriela Sabatini | 6 | 6
6 | (Czech Republic) Jana Novotná | 2 | 3
5 | (United States) Mary Joe Fernández | 6^{4} | 3
16 | (Japan) Kimiko Date | 7^{7} | 6
20 | (Georgia (country)) Leila Meskhi | 5 | 1
2 | (Spain) Arantxa Sánchez Vicario | 7 | 6

Semifinals
1 | (Germany) Steffi Graf | 6 | 6
3 | (Argentina) Gabriela Sabatini | 0 | 2
16 | (Japan) Kimiko Date | 2 | 1
2 | (Spain) Arantxa Sánchez Vicario | 6 | 6

Final
1 | (Germany) Steffi Graf | 4 | 6 | 3
2 | (Spain) Arantxa Sánchez Vicario | 6 | 3 | 6

=== Top half ===
==== Section 1 ====
First round
WC | (United States) B Nagelsen | 4 | 6 | 0
(United States) C Rubin | 6 | 4 | 6
WC | (United States) N Arendt | 1 | 7 | 6
Q | (Argentina) MJ Gaidano | 6 | 5 | 2
(Switzerland) C Fauche | 3 | 0
(France) S Testud | 6 | 6
(Argentina) M Paz | 3 | 3
Q | (Italy) S Farina | 6 | 6

Second round
1 | (Germany) S Graf | 6 | 6
(United States) C Rubin | 2 | 1
WC | (United States) N Arendt | 7 | 6
22 | (Netherlands) B Schultz | 5 | 1
26 | (United States) P Fendick | 6 | 6
(France) S Testud | 2 | 2
Q | (Italy) S Farina | 1 | 7 | 6
15 | (Japan) N Sawamatsu | 6 | 5 | 1

Third round
1 | (Germany) S Graf | 6 | 6
WC | (United States) N Arendt | 1 | 0
26 | (United States) P Fendick | 7^{7} | 6
Q | (Italy) S Farina | 6^{0} | 2

Fourth round
1 | (Germany) S Graf | 6 | 6
26 | (United States) P Fendick | 1 | 4

==== Section 2 ====
First round
(United States) T Whitlinger | 6 | 6
(South Africa) E Reinach | 2 | 2
(United Kingdom) J Durie | 2 | 6 | 6
Q | (Greece) C Papadáki | 6 | 1 | 2
WC | (Mexico) A Gavaldón | 7 | 3 | 6
Q | (Canada) M Drake | 5 | 6 | 3
(United States) C Kuhlman | 6 | 6
(Germany) S Meier | 4 | 3

Second round
11 | (United States) Z Garrison-Jackson | 6 | 6
(United States) T Whitlinger | 4 | 2
(United Kingdom) J Durie | 6 | 6^{5} | 6
24 | (Italy) S Cecchini | 3 | 7^{7} | 1
19 | (United States) G Fernández | 6 | 7
WC | (Mexico) A Gavaldón | 2 | 5
(United States) C Kuhlman | 6^{0} | 1
8 | (France) N Tauziat | 7^{7} | 6

Third round
11 | (United States) Z Garrison-Jackson | 6 | 3 | 6
(United Kingdom) J Durie | 1 | 6 | 0
19 | (United States) G Fernández | 1 | 4
8 | (France) N Tauziat | 6 | 6

Fourth round
11 | (United States) Z Garrison-Jackson | 4 | 7 | 5
8 | (France) N Tauziat | 6 | 5 | 7

==== Section 3 ====
First round
(Russia) E Maniokova | 2 | 6 | 4
Q | (United States) J Emmons | 6 | 4 | 6
(Indonesia) Y Basuki | 6^{4} | 1
(South Africa) D Van Rensburg | 7^{7} | 6
LL | (Germany) C Singer | 6 | 6
(Netherlands) M Bollegraf | 4 | 4
(Italy) G Pizzichini | 7 | 7^{8}
WC | (United States) M McGrath | 5 | 6^{6}

Second round
3 | (Argentina) G Sabatini | 6 | 6
Q | (United States) J Emmons | 2 | 3
(South Africa) D Van Rensburg | 7^{7} | 1 | 6
30 | (Germany) W Probst | 6^{5} | 6 | 4
32 | (Argentina) F Labat | 7^{7} | 4 | 6
LL | (Germany) C Singer | 6^{1} | 6 | 2
(Italy) G Pizzichini | 4 | 2
9 | (South Africa) A Coetzer | 6 | 6

Third round
3 | (Argentina) G Sabatini | 6 | 7
(South Africa) D Van Rensburg | 2 | 5
32 | (Argentina) F Labat | 6^{6} | 3
9 | (South Africa) A Coetzer | 7^{8} | 6

Fourth round
3 | (Argentina) G Sabatini | 1 | 6 | 6
9 | (South Africa) A Coetzer | 6 | 2 | 1

==== Section 4 ====
First round
WC | (United States) T Austin | 3 | 1
(Netherlands) S Rottier | 6 | 6
(Peru) L Gildemeister | 7 | 7
(Australia) R Stubbs | 5 | 5
Q | (Israel) Y Segal | 6 | 7
(United States) C Cunningham | 3 | 5
LL | (Australia) L Field | 3 | 6 | 6
(United States) D Faber | 6 | 4 | 3

Second round
12 | (France) J Halard | 4 | 4
(Netherlands) S Rottier | 6 | 6
(Peru) L Gildemeister | 3 | 3
28 | (Latvia) L Neiland | 6 | 6
21 | (Canada) P Hy | 7 | 6
Q | (Israel) Y Segal | 5 | 3
LL | (Australia) L Field | 2 | 2
6 | (Czech Republic) J Novotná | 6 | 6

Third round
(Netherlands) S Rottier | 6 | 7^{7}
28 | (Latvia) L Neiland | 2 | 6^{5}
21 | (Canada) P Hy | 6 | 5 | 2
6 | (Czech Republic) J Novotná | 3 | 7 | 6

Fourth round
(Netherlands) S Rottier | 2 | 4
6 | (Czech Republic) J Novotná | 6 | 6

=== Bottom half ===
==== Section 5 ====
First round
(France) I Demongeot | 3 | 6 | 6
WC | (Australia) E Smylie | 6 | 3 | 2
(United States) L Raymond | 6 | 6
(Hungary) A Temesvári | 4 | 4
(United States) G Helgeson | 6 | 5 | 3
(Australia) R McQuillan | 4 | 7 | 6
(United States) S Stafford | 6 | 4 | 6
(Australia) J Byrne | 2 | 6 | 1

Second round
5 | (United States) MJ Fernández | 1 | 7 | 6
(France) I Demongeot | 6 | 5 | 2
(United States) L Raymond | 6^{1} | 1
25 | (Germany) B Rittner | 7^{7} | 6
29 | (United States) L Harvey Wild | 3 | 2
(Australia) R McQuillan | 6 | 6
(United States) S Stafford | 4 | 1
13 | (United States) L McNeil | 6 | 6

Third round
5 | (United States) MJ Fernández | 6^{5} | 6 | 7^{7}
25 | (Germany) B Rittner | 7^{7} | 3 | 6^{0}
(Australia) R McQuillan | 6 | 3 | 3
13 | (United States) L McNeil | 2 | 6 | 6

Fourth round
5 | (United States) MJ Fernández | 6 | 7^{7}
13 | (United States) L McNeil | 4 | 6^{1}

==== Section 6 ====
First round
LL | (France) N Herreman | 1 | 4
(United States) M Werdel | 6 | 6
(Australia) A Minter | 4 | 3
(Croatia) N Ercegović | 6 | 6
(United States) L Davenport | 6 | 6
(United States) K Po | 0 | 4
(Finland) N Dahlman | 4 | 6^{5}
(Argentina) I Gorrochategui | 6 | 7^{7}

Second round
16 | (Japan) K Date | 6 | 7
(United States) M Werdel | 1 | 5
(Croatia) N Ercegović | 1 | 4
23 | (Slovakia) R Zrubáková | 6 | 6
18 | (Austria) J Wiesner | 6 | 6
(United States) L Davenport | 4 | 2
(Argentina) I Gorrochategui | 1 | 0
4 | (United States) J Capriati | 6 | 6

Third round
16 | (Japan) K Date | 5 | 6 | 6
23 | (Slovakia) R Zrubáková | 7 | 1 | 1
18 | (Austria) J Wiesner | 3 | 7 | 6
4 | (United States) J Capriati | 6 | 5 | 4

Fourth round
16 | (Japan) K Date | 6 | 6
18 | (Austria) J Wiesner | 3 | 3

==== Section 7 ====
First round
(Australia) M Jaggard-Lai | 4 | 4
(Argentina) B Fulco-Villella | 6 | 6
(United States) L Allen | 4 | 3
(Netherlands) M Oremans | 6 | 6
WC | (United States) J Steven | 6 | 6
(Czech Republic) K Kroupová | 3 | 3
(Canada) H Kelesi | 6^{6} | 6 | 6
Q | (Paraguay) R de los Ríos | 7^{8} | 3 | 4

Second round
7 | (Germany) A Huber | 6 | 6
(Argentina) B Fulco-Villella | 3 | 2
(Netherlands) M Oremans | 6 | 3 | 6
27 | (Germany) S Hack | 4 | 6 | 4
20 | (Georgia (country)) L Meskhi | 6 | 6
WC | (United States) J Steven | 4 | 3
(Canada) H Kelesi | 6 | 6
LL | (United States) E deLone | 3 | 1

Third round
7 | (Germany) A Huber | 5 | 7 | 2
(Netherlands) M Oremans | 7 | 5 | 6
20 | (Georgia (country)) L Meskhi | 6 | 7
(Canada) H Kelesi | 1 | 5

Fourth round
(Netherlands) M Oremans | 6 | 5 | 0
20 | (Georgia (country)) L Meskhi | 3 | 7 | 6

==== Section 8 ====
First round
(Japan) N Miyagi | 6^{3} | 3
WC | (United States) K Rinaldi | 7^{7} | 6
(United States) D Graham | 6 | 6
Q | (United States) S McCarthy | 1 | 3
(Italy) K Piccolini | 0 | 2
(United States) A Grossman | 6 | 6
(United States) R White | 4 | 6 | 2
(South Africa) R Fairbank-Nideffer | 6 | 1 | 6

Second round
14 | (Belarus) N Zvereva | 7^{7} | 7^{7}
WC | (United States) K Rinaldi | 6^{1} | 6^{4}
(United States) D Graham | 5 | 7^{8} | 6
17 | (United States) P Shriver | 7 | 6^{6} | 4
31 | (Croatia) I Majoli | 6^{1} | 4
(United States) A Grossman | 7^{7} | 6
(South Africa) R Fairbank-Nideffer | 3 | 1
2 | (Spain) A Sánchez Vicario | 6 | 6

Third round
14 | (Belarus) N Zvereva | 6 | 6
(United States) D Graham | 3 | 1
(United States) A Grossman | 0 | 2
2 | (Spain) A Sánchez Vicario | 6 | 6

Fourth round
14 | (Belarus) N Zvereva | 4 | 6 | 3
2 | (Spain) A Sánchez Vicario | 6 | 2 | 6
