= Stephanie Rottier =

Dutch tennis player

- Country (sports): Netherlands
- Born: 22 January 1974 (age 52) Sint-Niklaas, Belgium
- Turned pro: 1990
- Plays: 1998
- Prize money: $ 327,938

Singles
- Career record: 150–101
- Career titles: 0 WTA, 1 ITF
- Highest ranking: No. 30 (26 April 1993)

Grand Slam singles results
- Australian Open: 1R (1991, 1993, 1994, 1995)
- French Open: 2R (1994)
- Wimbledon: 1R (1995)
- US Open: 1R (1991–95)

Doubles
- Career record: 22–21
- Career titles: 0 WTA, 2 ITF
- Highest ranking: No. 93 (20 May 1996)

Stephanie Rottier (born 22 January 1974) is a former professional Dutch tennis player.

== Early life ==
Rottier was born in Sint-Niklaas and grew up in Stekene in Belgium, near the border with the Netherlands. When she was three years old, her family moved right across the border to Sint Jansteen. At the age of seven, she joined a local tennis club. In 1990, at age 16, she moved to Amsterdam to join a tennis academy. That year, she won the national juniors title and in 1992 she became national champion.

== Results ==
Rottier broke through in 1993, reaching the final in Tokyo, which she lost to Kimiko Date in straight sets. She also reached the semifinals in Indian Wells and the fourth round in Key Biscayne. Through these results, she rose to 30th place on the rankings, making her the highest placed Dutch female player at the time. A year later, she reached the second round of the 1994 French Open. She reached the final of the WTA doubles tournament in Beijing in 1995 partnering Wang Shi-ting, and losing to Claudia Porwik and Linda Wild, also in straight sets. After 1994, Rottier sustained injuries to her arm, shoulder, elbow, leg and ankle. She missed a lot of matches and gradually fell out of the top 100 of the rankings. However, she did manage to win an ITF Tour tournament in Seoul in 1996. In 1998, at age 24, Rottier was forced to retire from professional tennis.

== Federation Cup ==
Rottier played three Federation Cup singles matches for the Netherlands in 1993, winning against Maja Murić of Croatia 6–2, 6–0 and against Oksana Bushevitsa of Latvia 6–4, 6–2, before losing to Conchita Martínez of Spain in two sets.

== WTA career finals ==
Legend
Grand Slam tournaments (0–0)
WTA Tour Championships (0–0)
Tier I (0–0)
Tier II (0–0)
Tier III, IV & V (0–1)

=== Singles: (1 runner-up) ===
Result	No.	Date	Tournament	Surface	Opponent	Score
Loss	1.	Apr 1993	Tokyo, Japan	Hard	(Japan) Kimiko Date	1–6, 3–6

=== Doubles (1 runner-up) ===
Result	No.	Date	Tournament	Surface	Partner	Opponents	Score
Loss	1.	Sep 1995	Beijing, China	Hard	(Chinese Taipei) Wang Shi-ting	(Germany) Claudia Porwik (United States) Linda Wild	1–6, 0–6

== ITF finals ==
=== Singles: (1-4) ===
$100,000 tournaments
$75,000 tournaments
$50,000 tournaments
$25,000 tournaments
$10,000 tournaments

Result	No.	Date	Tournament	Surface	Opponent	Score
Loss	1.	23 July 1990	A Coruña, Spain	Clay	(Spain) Silvia Ramón-Cortés	5–7, 3–6
Loss	2.	24 September 1990	Chicago, United States	Hard	(United States) Louise Allen	4–6, 1–6
Loss	3.	5 February 1996	Würzburg, Germany	Carpet (i)	(France) Anne-Gaëlle Sidot	4–6, 1–6
Win	4.	5 May 1996	Seoul, South Korea	Clay	(Japan) Misumi Miyauchi	6–1, 6–0
Loss	5.	13 January 1997	Helsinki, Finland	Hard (i)	(Czech Republic) Gabriela Chmelinová	6–3, 4–6, 2–2 ret.

=== Doubles: (2-1) ===
Result	No	Date	Tournament	Surface	Partner	Opponents	Score
Loss	1.	17 June 1991	Modena, Italy	Clay	(Netherlands) Yvonne Grubben	(Czechoslovakia) Denisa Krajčovičová (Czechoslovakia) Jana Pospíšilová	1–6, 4–6
Win	2.	24 July 1995	Heerhugowaard, Netherlands	Clay	(Netherlands) Stephanie Gomperts	(Ukraine) Natalia Chasovaya (Russia) Anna Linkova	6–4, 6–1
Win	3.	5 February 1996	Würzburg, Germany	Carpet (i)	(Netherlands) Stephanie Gomperts	(Austria) Karin Kschwendt (Czech Republic) Eva Martincová	6–2, 6–3
