= Ei Iida =

Japanese tennis player (born 1967)

- Country (sports): Japan
- Born: 9 September 1967 (age 57)
- Prize money: $149,368

Singles
- Career record: 115–137
- Career titles: 3 ITF
- Highest ranking: No. 203 (24 August 1992)

Grand Slam singles results
- Australian Open: 1R (1988)
- US Open: 1R (1989)

Doubles
- Career record: 146–105
- Career titles: 1 WTA, 14 ITF
- Highest ranking: No. 44 (19 April 1993)

Grand Slam doubles results
- Australian Open: 2R (1988)
- French Open: 1R (1994)
- Wimbledon: 2R (1991)
- US Open: 1R (1993)

Ei Iida (born 9 September 1967) is a former professional tennis player from Japan.

== Biography ==
Iida qualified for the singles main draw of two Grand Slam tournaments, the 1988 Australian Open and 1989 US Open. Her first-round opponent at the US Open was Martina Navratilova, who went on to make the final.

As a doubles player, she reached No. 44 in the world and won one WTA Tour title, the 1993 Japan Open, partnering Maya Kidowaki.

Early in her career, she played collegiate tennis for Pepperdine University in the United States.

== WTA career finals ==
=== Doubles: 1 (1 title) ===
Result	Date	Tournament	Tier	Surface	Partner	Opponents	Score
Win	Apr 1993	Japan Open	Tier III	Hard	(Japan) Maya Kidowaki	(China) Li Fang (Japan) Kyōko Nagatsuka	6–2, 4–6, 6–4

== ITF Circuit finals ==
$50,000 tournaments
$25,000 tournaments
$10,000 tournaments

=== Singles: 5 (3–2) ===
Result	No.	Date	Tournament	Surface	Opponent	Score
Loss	1.	8 November 1987	ITF Saga, Japan	Grass	(United States) Stephanie Savides	6–3, 6–7, 1–6
Loss	2.	16 October 1988	ITF Kofu, Japan	Grass	(Japan) Tamaka Takagi	6–2, 3–6, 3–6
Win	1.	30 October 1989	ITF Saga, Japan	Grass	(Japan) Ayako Hirose	6–1, 7–6^{(6)}
Win	2.	28 October 1991	ITF Saga, Japan	Grass	(China) Li Fang	6–3, 6–3
Win	3.	7 November 1993	ITF Saga, Japan	Grass	(Japan) Maya Kidowaki	6–2, 7–5

=== Doubles: 22 (14–8) ===
Result	No.	Date	Tournament	Surface	Partner	Opponents	Score
Loss	1.	28 October 1985	ITF Fukuoka, Japan	Hard	(Japan) Naoko Sato	(Netherlands) Nanette Schutte (Netherlands) Marianne van der Torre	3–6, 5–7
Win	1.	4 November 1985	ITF Ibaraki, Japan	Hard	(China) Zhong Ni	(Netherlands) Nanette Schutte (Netherlands) Marianne van der Torre	7–5, 6–3
Loss	2.	11 November 1985	ITF Matsuyama, Japan	Hard	(China) Zhong Ni	(Netherlands) Nanette Schutte (Netherlands) Marianne van der Torre	2–6, 1–6
Loss	3.	25 November 1985	ITF Kyoto, Japan	Hard	(China) Zhong Ni	(Netherlands) Nanette Schutte (Netherlands) Marianne van der Torre	4–6, 2–6
Win	2.	11 October 1987	ITF Kofu, Japan	Hard	(Japan) Akemi Nishiya	(Japan) Kumiko Okamoto (Japan) Naoko Sato	7–5, 6–2
Win	3.	8 November 1987	ITF Saga, Japan	Hard	(Japan) Maya Kidowaki	(Japan) Kumiko Okamoto (Japan) Naoko Sato	7–6, 3–6, 9–7
Win	4.	15 November 1987	ITF Kyoto, Japan	Hard	(Japan) Maya Kidowaki	(Japan) Junko Kimuro (Japan) Hijiri Nakazaka	6–2, 6–2
Loss	4.	12 June 1988	ITF Modena, Italy	Clay	(Indonesia) Yayuk Basuki	(Soviet Union) Eugenia Maniokova (Soviet Union) Viktoria Milvidskaia	3–6, 6–4, 0–6
Loss	5.	3 July 1988	ITF Brindisi, Italy	Clay	(Indonesia) Yayuk Basuki	(France) Frédérique Martin (France) Virginie Paquet	7–5, 2–6, 2–6
Loss	6.	11 July 1988	ITF Vaihingen, West Germany	Clay	(Japan) Maya Kidowaki	(South Africa) Linda Barnard (South Africa) Amanda Coetzer	6–3, 3–6, 4–6
Win	5.	16 October 1988	ITF Chiba, Japan	Hard	(Indonesia) Yayuk Basuki	(Japan) Naoko Sato (Japan) Maya Kidowaki	6–2, 7–6
Loss	7.	26 June 1989	ITF Arezzo, Italy	Clay	(United States) Anne Grousbeck	(Argentina) Gabriela Castro (Spain) Conchita Martínez	w/o
Win	6.	25 September 1989	ITF Chiba, Japan	Hard	(Japan) Maya Kidowaki	(New Zealand) Belinda Cordwell (New Zealand) Julie Richardson	7–6, 6–4
Win	7.	15 October 1989	ITF Nagasaki, Japan	Hard	(Japan) Maya Kidowaki	(Australia) Kate McDonald (Japan) Tamaka Takagi	6–2, 3–6, 6–2
Win	8.	30 October 1989	ITF Saga, Japan	Grass	(Japan) Naoko Sato	(United States) Lynn Nabors (Mexico) Lupita Novelo	7–6^{(3)}, 4–6, 6–3
Win	9.	22 April 1990	ITF Turin, Italy	Clay	(Indonesia) Suzanna Wibowo	(Italy) Federica Bonsignori (Hungary) Andrea Noszály	7–5, 3–6, 6–4
Win	10.	1 July 1990	ITF Cerignola, Italy	Clay	(United States) Jennifer Fuchs	(Italy) Simona Isidori (Italy) Caterina Nozzoli	6–1, 6–1
Loss	8.	10 February 1991	ITF Jakarta, Indonesia	Clay	(Japan) Misumi Miyauchi	(Australia) Kerry-Anne Guse (Australia) Justine Hodder	6–7, 5–7
Win	11.	15 July 1991	ITF Evansville, United States	Hard	(Japan) Ayako Hirose	(United States) Kathy Foxworth (United States) Shannan McCarthy	6–3, 2–6, 6–4
Win	12.	25 October 1993	ITF Jakarta, Indonesia	Hard	(Japan) Nana Smith	(Australia) Robyn Mawdsley (United Kingdom) Julie Pullin	6–4, 7–5
Win	13.	7 November 1993	ITF Saga, Japan	Grass	(Japan) Maya Kidowaki	(Japan) Mana Endo (Japan) Naoko Sawamatsu	6–2, 3–6, 6–2
Win	14.	31 October 1994	ITF Saga, Japan	Grass	(Australia) Louise Pleming	(Japan) Mami Donoshiro (Japan) Yuka Tanaka	6–3, 7–6^{(2)}
