= Maya Kidowaki =

Japanese tennis player (born 1969)

- Country (sports): Japan
- Born: 17 May 1969 (age 57) Kyoto Prefecture, Japan
- Retired: 1994
- Prize money: $286,615

Singles
- Career record: 152–116
- Career titles: 6 ITF
- Highest ranking: No. 68 (4 November 1991)

Grand Slam singles results
- Australian Open: 2R (1990, 1991, 1992)
- French Open: 3R (1991)
- Wimbledon: 2R (1991)
- US Open: 1R (1990, 1991)

Doubles
- Career record: 117–95
- Career titles: 2 WTA, 7 ITF
- Highest ranking: No. 34 (2 March 1992)

Grand Slam doubles results
- Australian Open: 2R (1991)
- French Open: 2R (1990, 1993)
- Wimbledon: 2R (1991)
- US Open: 2R (1991)

Team competitions
- Fed Cup: 3–3

Maya Kidowaki (木戸脇 真也, Kidowaki Maya; born 17 May 1969) is a retired Japanese tennis player.

== Tennis career ==
Kidowaki represented Japan at the 1992 Summer Olympics in doubles with Kimiko Date and they lost to Jana Novotná and Andrea Strnadová in the third round, in two sets. She also competed in the Australian Open main draw.

== WTA career finals ==
=== Doubles: 2 (2 titles) ===
Result	No.	Date	Tournament	Surface	Partner	Opponents	Score
Win	1.	Apr 1991	Japan Open	Hard	(United States) Amy Frazier	(Japan) Yone Kamio (Japan) Akiko Kijimuta	6–2, 6–4
Win	2.	Apr 1993	Japan Open	Hard	(Japan) Ei Iida	(China) Li Fang (Japan) Kyōko Nagatsuka	6–2, 4–6, 6–4

== ITF Circuit finals ==
$50,000 tournaments
$25,000 tournaments
$10,000 tournaments

=== Singles: 11 (6–5) ===
Result	No.	Date	Tournament	Surface	Opponent	Score
Win	1.	5 July 1987	ITF Litchfield, United States	Clay	(Australia) Stephanie Faulkner	6–3, 6–1
Loss	2.	9 August 1987	ITF Lebanon, United States	Hard	(United States) Shaun Stafford	3–6, 3–6
Win	3.	25 October 1987	ITF Ibaraki, Japan	Hard	(Japan) Miki Mizokuchi	6–4, 6–1
Loss	4.	10 November 1987	ITF Matsuyama, Japan	Hard	(Indonesia) Suzanna Wibowo	3–6, 3–6
Win	5.	23 October 1988	ITF Kuroshio, Japan	Hard	(Japan) Tamaka Takagi	6–1, 6–3
Win	6.	30 October 1988	ITF Ibaraki, Japan	Hard	(Japan) Shiho Okada	6–2, 6–2
Win	7.	5 November 1988	ITF Saga, Japan	Grass	(China) Chen Li	6–4, 3–6, 6–3
Loss	8.	13 November 1988	ITF Matsuyama, Japan	Hard	(Japan) Kimiko Date	3–6, 4–6
Loss	9.	14 November 1988	ITF Kyoto, Japan	Hard	(Japan) Kimiko Date	5–7, 6–4, 4–6
Win	10.	1 October 1989	ITF Kofu, Japan	Hard	(Japan) Rika Hiraki	7–5, 6–0
Loss	11.	7 November 1993	ITF Saga, Japan	Grass	(Japan) Ei Iida	2–6, 5–7

=== Doubles: 12 (7–5) ===
Result	No.	Date	Tournament	Surface	Partner	Opponents	Score
Win	1.	4 August 1986	ITF Chatham, United States	Hard	(United States) Anne Grousbeck	(Australia) Colleen Carney (Brazil) Luciana Corsato-Owsianka	6–3, 6–4
Win	2.	8 November 1987	ITF Saga, Japan	Hard	(Japan) Ei Iida	(Japan) Kumiko Okamoto (Japan) Naoko Sato	7–6, 3–6, 9–7
Win	3.	15 November 1987	ITF Kyoto, Japan	Hard	(Japan) Ei Iida	(Japan) Junko Kimuro (Japan) Hijiri Nakazaka	6–2, 6–2
Loss	4.	11 July 1988	ITF Stuttgart, West Germany	Clay	(Japan) Ei Iida	(South Africa) Linda Barnard (South Africa) Amanda Coetzer	6–3, 3–6, 4–6
Loss	5.	16 October 1988	ITF Chiba, Japan	Hard	(Japan) Naoko Sato	(Indonesia) Yayuk Basuki (Japan) Ei Iida	2–6, 6–7
Loss	6.	24 October 1988	ITF Ibaraki, Japan	Hard	(Hong Kong) Paulette Moreno	(Japan) Kimiko Date (Japan) Yuko Hosoki	4–6, 6–4, 7–9
Win	7.	6 November 1988	ITF Saga, Japan	Grass	(Japan) Naoko Sato	(Japan) Kimiko Date (Japan) Yuko Hosoki	6–4, 7–5
Loss	8.	13 November 1988	ITF Matsuyama, Japan	Hard	(Japan) Yasuyo Kajita	(Japan) Kimiko Date (Japan) Yuko Hosoki	5–7, 6–3, 5–7
Win	9.	25 September 1989	ITF Chiba, Japan	Hard	(Japan) Ei Iida	(New Zealand) Belinda Cordwell (New Zealand) Julie Richardson	7–6, 6–4
Win	10.	15 October 1989	ITF Nagasaki, Japan	Hard	(Japan) Ei Iida	(Australia) Kate McDonald (Japan) Tamaka Takagi	6–2, 3–6, 6–2
Loss	11.	2 November 1992	ITF Machida, Japan	Grass	(Netherlands) Ingelise Driehuis	(New Zealand) Julie Richardson (Australia) Michelle Jaggard-Lai	3–6, 5–7
Win	12.	7 November 1993	ITF Saga, Japan	Grass	(Japan) Ei Iida	(Japan) Mana Endo (Japan) Naoko Sawamatsu	6–2, 3–6, 6–2
