= Japan Open (tennis) =

Men's professional tennis tournament

Coordinates: 35.636°N 139.791°E

Kinoshita Group Japan Open

Tournament information
- Founded: 1972; 54 years ago
- Location: Tokyo, Japan
- Venue: Ariake Coliseum, Musashino Forest Sports Plaza (2018)
- Surface: Hard / outdoors (1972, 1976–1977, 1982–2017, 2019–); Clay / outdoors (1973–1975, 1978–1981); Hard / indoors (2018)
- Website: japanopentennis.com/atp

Current champions (2026)
- Men's singles: (Spain) Carlos Alcaraz
- Men's doubles: (United States) Austin Krajicek (Croatia) Nikola Mektić
ATP Tour
- Category: ATP 500 (2009-present)/ ATP International Series Gold (2000–2008)/ ATP Championship Series (1990–1999); Grand Prix circuit (1973–1989)
- Draw: 32S / 24Q / 16D
- Prize money: US$2,226,470 (2025), $2,046,340 (2019)
WTA Tour
- Category: Tier III
- Draw: 32M / 32Q / 16D
- Prize money: US$175,000 (2008)

The Kinoshita Group Japan Open Tennis Championships, sponsored by the Kinoshita Group, is a tennis tournament held in Ariake Tennis Forest Park with its center court Ariake Coliseum, located in Koto, Tokyo, since 1972. The men's event is an ATP 500-level tournament since 2009. The championships included combined ATP and WTA Tour singles and doubles events until 2008, when the women's event was moved to Osaka.

In 2018, the venue switched to the Musashino Forest Sport Plaza as the Ariake Coliseum was renovated for the tennis events at the 2020 Summer Olympics.

== History ==
The Japan Open was first held in 1972 as a minor ATP event and from 1973 was part of the Grand Prix tennis tour. The Japan Open was known as the "Tokyo Outdoor Grand Prix" between 1973 and 1989. From 1990 it was part of the ATP Tour.

From 1979 until 2008, the Japan Open was a joint tournament for both men and women. This is no longer the case in the aftermath of the Ariake Coliseum hosting another women's professional tournament, the Pan Pacific Open. On the WTA Tour, the Japan Open was moved to Osaka as the Japan Women's Open in 2009. On the ITF Women's Circuit a $100,000+H event was held as the Rakuten Japan Open Tennis Championships in 2009 and in 2010. Starting in 2015 another Tokyo event is held also as a W100 tournament at the Ariake Coliseum.

== Past finals ==
=== Men's singles ===
Year	Champion	Runner-up	Score
1972 (Note: Tournament recognized as minor title by ATP.)	(Japan) Toshiro Sakai	(Japan) Jun Kuki	6–3, 6–3
↓ Grand Prix circuit ↓
1973	(Australia) Ken Rosewall	(Australia) John Newcombe	6–1, 6–4
1974	(Australia) John Newcombe	(Australia) Ken Rosewall	3–6, 6–2, 6–3
1975	(Mexico) Raúl Ramírez	(Spain) Manuel Orantes	6–4, 7–5, 6–3
1976	(United States) Roscoe Tanner	(Italy) Corrado Barazzutti	6–3, 6–2
1977	(Spain) Manuel Orantes	(Australia) Kim Warwick	6–2, 6–1
1978	(Italy) Adriano Panatta	(United States) Pat DuPré	6–3, 6–3
1979	(United States) Terry Moor	(United States) Pat DuPré	3–6, 7–6, 6–2
1980	(Czechoslovakia) Ivan Lendl	(United States) Eliot Teltscher	3–6, 6–4, 6–0
1981	(Hungary) Balázs Taróczy	(United States) Eliot Teltscher	6–3, 1–6, 7–6
1982	(United States) Jimmy Arias	(France) Dominique Bedel	6–2, 2–6, 6–4
1983	(United States) Eliot Teltscher	(Ecuador) Andrés Gómez	7–5, 3–6, 6–1
1984	(United States) David Pate	(United States) Terry Moor	6–3, 7–5
1985	(United States) Scott Davis	(United States) Jimmy Arias	6–1, 7–6
1986	(India) Ramesh Krishnan	(Sweden) Johan Carlsson	6–3, 6–1
1987	(Sweden) Stefan Edberg	(United States) David Pate	7–6, 6–4
1988	(United States) John McEnroe	(Sweden) Stefan Edberg	6–2, 6–2
1989	(Sweden) Stefan Edberg (2)	(Czechoslovakia) Ivan Lendl	6–3, 2–6, 6–4
⬆ Grand Prix circuit ⬆
↓ ATP Tour 500 (Note: Known as Championship Series from 1990 till 1999 and International Series Gold from 2000 till 2008.) ↓
1990	(Sweden) Stefan Edberg (3)	(United States) Aaron Krickstein	6–4, 7–5
1991	(Sweden) Stefan Edberg (4)	(Czechoslovakia) Ivan Lendl	6–1, 7–5, 6–0
1992	(United States) Jim Courier	(Netherlands) Richard Krajicek	6–4, 6–4, 7–6
1993	(United States) Pete Sampras	(United States) Brad Gilbert	6–2, 6–2, 6–2
1994	(United States) Pete Sampras (2)	(United States) Michael Chang	6–4, 6–2
1995	(United States) Jim Courier (2)	(United States) Andre Agassi	6–3, 6–4
1996	(United States) Pete Sampras (3)	(United States) Richey Reneberg	6–4, 7–5
1997	(Netherlands) Richard Krajicek	(France) Lionel Roux	6–2, 3–6, 6–1
1998	(Romania) Andrei Pavel	(Zimbabwe) Byron Black	6–3, 6–4
1999	(Germany) Nicolas Kiefer	(South Africa) Wayne Ferreira	7–6^{(7–5)}, 7–5
2000	(Netherlands) Sjeng Schalken	(Ecuador) Nicolás Lapentti	6–4, 3–6, 6–1
2001	(Australia) Lleyton Hewitt	(Switzerland) Michel Kratochvil	6–4, 6–2
2002	(Denmark) Kenneth Carlsen	(Sweden) Magnus Norman	7–6^{(8–6)}, 6–3
2003	(Germany) Rainer Schüttler	(France) Sébastien Grosjean	7–6^{(7–5)}, 6–2
2004	(Czech Republic) Jiří Novák	(United States) Taylor Dent	5–7, 6–1, 6–3
2005	(South Africa) Wesley Moodie	(Croatia) Mario Ančić	1–6, 7–6^{(9–7)}, 6–4
2006	(Switzerland) Roger Federer	(United Kingdom) Tim Henman	6–3, 6–3
2007	(Spain) David Ferrer	(France) Richard Gasquet	6–1, 6–2
2008	(Czech Republic) Tomáš Berdych	(Argentina) Juan Martín del Potro	6–1, 6–4
2009	(France) Jo-Wilfried Tsonga	(Russia) Mikhail Youzhny	6–3, 6–3
2010	(Spain) Rafael Nadal	(France) Gaël Monfils	6–1, 7–5
2011	(United Kingdom) Andy Murray	(Spain) Rafael Nadal	3–6, 6–2, 6–0
2012	(Japan) Kei Nishikori	(Canada) Milos Raonic	7–6^{(7–5)}, 3–6, 6–0
2013	(Argentina) Juan Martín del Potro	(Canada) Milos Raonic	7–6^{(7–5)}, 7–5
2014	(Japan) Kei Nishikori (2)	(Canada) Milos Raonic	7–6^{(7–5)}, 4–6, 6–4
2015	(Switzerland) Stan Wawrinka	(France) Benoît Paire	6–2, 6–4
2016	(Australia) Nick Kyrgios	(Belgium) David Goffin	4−6, 6−3, 7−5
2017	(Belgium) David Goffin	(France) Adrian Mannarino	6−3, 7−5
2018	(Russia) Daniil Medvedev	(Japan) Kei Nishikori	6–2, 6–4
2019	(Serbia) Novak Djokovic	(Australia) John Millman	6–3, 6–2
2020	No competition (due to COVID-19 pandemic)		
2021	No competition (due to COVID-19 pandemic)		
2022	(United States) Taylor Fritz	(United States) Frances Tiafoe	7–6^{(7–3)}, 7–6^{(7–2)}
2023	(United States) Ben Shelton	Aslan Karatsev	7–5, 6–1
2024	(France) Arthur Fils	(France) Ugo Humbert	5–7, 7–6^{(8–6)}, 6–3
2025	(Spain) Carlos Alcaraz	(United States) Taylor Fritz	6–4, 6–4
2026	(Spain) Carlos Alcaraz (2)	(Czech Republic) Jiří Lehečka	7–6^{(7–4)}, 6–4

=== Women's singles ===
Year	Champion	Runner-up	Score
1973	(Australia) Evonne Goolagong	(West Germany) Helga Niessen Masthoff	6–3, 6–4
1974	(Brazil) Maria Bueno	(West Germany) Katja Ebbinghaus	3–6, 6–4, 6–3
1975	(Japan) Kazuko Sawamatsu	(United States) Ann Kiyomura	6–2, 3–6, 6–1
1976	(Australia) Wendy Turnbull	(Belgium) Michèle Gurdal	6–1, 6–1
1977	not held		
1978	(United States) Ann Kiyomura	(Japan) Sonoe Yonezawa	6–4, 6–2
1979	(United States) Betsy Nagelsen	(Japan) Naoko Sato	6–1, 3–6, 6–3
1980	(Romania) Mariana Simionescu	(Australia) Nerida Gregory	6–4, 6–4
1981	(Hungary) Marie Pinterová	(United States) Pam Casale	2–6, 6–4, 6–1
1982	(Peru) Laura Gildemeister	(Peru) Pilar Vásquez	3–6, 6–4, 6–0
1983	(Japan) Etsuko Inoue	(United States) Shelley Solomon	7–5, 6–2
1984	(Switzerland) Lilian Drescher	(United States) Shawn Foltz	6–4, 6–2
1985	(Argentina) Gabriela Sabatini	(United States) Linda Gates	6–3, 6–4
1986	(Canada) Helen Kelesi	(Argentina) Bettina Fulco-Villella	6–2, 6–2
1987	(Bulgaria) Katerina Maleeva	(United States) Barbara Gerken	6–2, 6–3
1988	(United States) Patty Fendick	(United States) Stephanie Rehe	6–3, 7–5
1989	(Japan) Kumiko Okamoto	(Australia) Elizabeth Smylie	6–4, 6–2
1990	(Sweden) Catarina Lindqvist	(Australia) Elizabeth Smylie	6–3, 6–2
1991	(United States) Lori McNeil	(Belgium) Sabine Appelmans	2–6, 6–2, 6–1
1992	(Japan) Kimiko Date	(Belgium) Sabine Appelmans	7–5, 3–6, 6–3
1993	(Japan) Kimiko Date (2)	(Netherlands) Stephanie Rottier	6–1, 6–3
1994	(Japan) Kimiko Date (3)	(United States) Amy Frazier	7–5, 6–0
1995	(United States) Amy Frazier	(Japan) Kimiko Date	7–6, 7–5
1996	(Japan) Kimiko Date (4)	(United States) Amy Frazier	7–5, 6–4
1997	(Japan) Ai Sugiyama	(United States) Amy Frazier	4–6, 6–4, 6–4
1998	(Japan) Ai Sugiyama (2)	(United States) Corina Morariu	6–3, 6–3
1999	(United States) Amy Frazier (2)	(Japan) Ai Sugiyama	6–2, 6–2
2000	(France) Julie Halard-Decugis	(United States) Amy Frazier	5–7, 7–5, 6–4
2001	(United States) Monica Seles	(Thailand) Tamarine Tanasugarn	6–3, 6–2
2002	(United States) Jill Craybas	(Croatia) Silvija Talaja	2–6, 6–4, 6–4
2003	(Russia) Maria Sharapova	(Hungary) Anikó Kapros	2–6, 6–2, 7–6^{(7–5)}
2004	(Russia) Maria Sharapova (2)	(United States) Mashona Washington	6–0, 6–1
2005	(Czech Republic) Nicole Vaidišová	(France) Tatiana Golovin	7–6^{(7–4)}, 3–2 ret.
2006	(France) Marion Bartoli	(Japan) Aiko Nakamura	2–6, 6–2, 6–2
2007	(France) Virginie Razzano	(United States) Venus Williams	4–6, 7–6^{(9–7)}, 6–4
2008	(Denmark) Caroline Wozniacki	(Estonia) Kaia Kanepi	6–2, 3–6, 6–1
2009	see Japan Women's Open		

=== Men's doubles ===
Year	Champions	Runners-up	Score
1972	(United States) Dick Dell (United States) Sherwood Stewart	(Mexico) Marcelo Lara (New Zealand) Jeff Simpson	6–3, 6–2
↓ Grand Prix circuit ↓
1973	(Australia) Mal Anderson (Australia) Ken Rosewall	(Australia) Colin Dibley (Australia) Allan Stone	7–5, 7–5
1974	not completed due to weather		
1975	(United States) Brian Gottfried (Mexico) Raúl Ramírez	(Spain) Juan Gisbert Sr. (Spain) Manuel Orantes	7–6, 6–4
1976	(Australia) Bob Carmichael (Australia) Ken Rosewall	(Egypt) Ismail El Shafei (New Zealand) Brian Fairlie	6–4, 6–4
1977	(Australia) Geoff Masters (Australia) Kim Warwick	(Australia) Colin Dibley (Australia) Chris Kachel	6–2, 7–6
1978	(Australia) Ross Case (Australia) Geoff Masters	(Socialist Federal Republic of Yugoslavia) Željko Franulović (United Kingdom) Buster Mottram	6–2, 4–6, 6–1
1979	(Australia) Colin Dibley (United States) Pat DuPré	(Australia) Rod Frawley (Paraguay) Francisco González	3–6, 6–1, 6–1
1980	(Australia) Ross Case (Chile) Jaime Fillol	(United States) Terry Moor (United States) Eliot Teltscher	6–3, 3–6, 6–4
1981	(Switzerland) Heinz Günthardt (Hungary) Balázs Taróczy	(United States) Larry Stefanki (United States) Robert Van't Hof	3–6, 6–2, 6–1
1982	(United States) Sherwood Stewart (United States) Ferdi Taygan	(United States) Tim Gullikson (United States) Tom Gullikson	6–1, 3–6, 7–6
1983	(United States) Sammy Giammalva Jr. (United States) Steve Meister	(United States) Tim Gullikson (United States) Tom Gullikson	6–4, 6–7, 7–6
1984	(United States) David Dowlen (Nigeria) Nduka Odizor	(United States) Mark Dickson (United States) Steve Meister	6–7, 6–4, 6–3
1985	(United States) Scott Davis (United States) David Pate	(United States) Sammy Giammalva Jr. (United States) Greg Holmes	7–6, 6–7, 6–3
1986	(United States) Matt Anger (United States) Ken Flach	(United States) Jimmy Arias (United States) Greg Holmes	6–2, 6–3
1987	(United States) Paul Annacone (United States) Kevin Curren	(Ecuador) Andrés Gómez (Sweden) Anders Järryd	6–4, 7–6
1988	(Australia) John Fitzgerald (United States) Johan Kriek	(United States) Steve Denton (United States) David Pate	6–4, 6–7, 6–4
1989	(United States) Ken Flach (United States) Robert Seguso	(United States) Kevin Curren (United States) David Pate	7–6, 7–6
⬆ Grand Prix circuit ⬆
↓ ATP Tour 500 ↓
1990	(Australia) Mark Kratzmann (Australia) Wally Masur	(United States) Kent Kinnear (United States) Brad Pearce	3–6, 6–3, 6–4
1991	(Sweden) Stefan Edberg (Australia) Todd Woodbridge	(Australia) John Fitzgerald (Sweden) Anders Järryd	6–4, 5–7, 6–4
1992	(United States) Kelly Jones (United States) Rick Leach	(Australia) John Fitzgerald (Sweden) Anders Järryd	0–6, 7–5, 6–3
1993	(United States) Ken Flach (United States) Rick Leach	(Canada) Glenn Michibata (United States) David Pate	2–6, 6–3, 6–4
1994	(Sweden) Henrik Holm (Sweden) Anders Järryd	(Canada) Sébastien Lareau (United States) Patrick McEnroe	7–5, 6–1
1995	(The Bahamas) Mark Knowles (United States) Jonathan Stark	(Australia) John Fitzgerald (Sweden) Anders Järryd	6–3, 3–6, 7–6
1996	(Australia) Todd Woodbridge (Australia) Mark Woodforde	(The Bahamas) Mark Knowles (United States) Rick Leach	6–2, 6–3
1997	(Czech Republic) Martin Damm (Czech Republic) Daniel Vacek	(United States) Justin Gimelstob (Australia) Patrick Rafter	2–6, 6–2, 7–6
1998	(Canada) Sébastien Lareau (Canada) Daniel Nestor	(France) Olivier Delaître (Italy) Stefano Pescosolido	6–3, 6–4
1999	(United States) Jeff Tarango (Czech Republic) Daniel Vacek	(Zimbabwe) Wayne Black (United States) Brian MacPhie	4–3, ret.
2000	(India) Mahesh Bhupathi (India) Leander Paes	(Australia) Michael Hill (United States) Jeff Tarango	6–4, 6–7, 6–3
2001	(United States) Rick Leach (Australia) David Macpherson	(Australia) Paul Hanley (Australia) Nathan Healey	1–6, 7–6, 7–6
2002	(South Africa) Jeff Coetzee (South Africa) Chris Haggard	(United States) Jan-Michael Gambill (United States) Graydon Oliver	7–6, 6–4
2003	(United States) Justin Gimelstob (Germany) Nicolas Kiefer	(United States) Scott Humphries (The Bahamas) Mark Merklein	6–7, 6–3, 7–6
2004	(United States) Jared Palmer (Czech Republic) Pavel Vízner	(Czech Republic) Jiří Novák (Czech Republic) Petr Pála	5–1, ret.
2005	(Japan) Satoshi Iwabuchi (Japan) Takao Suzuki	(Sweden) Simon Aspelin (Australia) Todd Perry	5–4, 5–4
2006	(Australia) Ashley Fisher (United States) Tripp Phillips	(United States) Paul Goldstein (United States) Jim Thomas	6–2, 7–5
2007	(Australia) Jordan Kerr (Sweden) Robert Lindstedt	(Canada) Frank Dancevic (Australia) Stephen Huss	6–4, 6–4
2008	(Russia) Mikhail Youzhny (Germany) Mischa Zverev	(Czech Republic) Lukáš Dlouhý (India) Leander Paes	6–3, 6–4
2009	(Austria) Julian Knowle (Austria) Jürgen Melzer	(United Kingdom) Ross Hutchins (Australia) Jordan Kerr	6–2, 5–7, [10–8]
2010	(United States) Eric Butorac (Netherlands Antilles) Jean-Julien Rojer	(Italy) Andreas Seppi (Russia) Dmitry Tursunov	6–3, 6–2
2011	(United Kingdom) Andy Murray (United Kingdom) Jamie Murray	(Czech Republic) František Čermák (Slovakia) Filip Polášek	6–1, 6–4
2012	(Austria) Alexander Peya (Brazil) Bruno Soares	(India) Leander Paes (Czech Republic) Radek Štěpánek	6–3, 7–6^{(7–5)}
2013	(India) Rohan Bopanna (France) Édouard Roger-Vasselin	(United Kingdom) Jamie Murray (Australia) John Peers	7–6^{(7–5)}, 6–4
2014	(France) Pierre-Hugues Herbert (Poland) Michał Przysiężny	(Croatia) Ivan Dodig (Brazil) Marcelo Melo	6–3, 6–7^{(3–7)}, [10–5]
2015	(South Africa) Raven Klaasen (Brazil) Marcelo Melo	(Colombia) Juan Sebastián Cabal (Colombia) Robert Farah	7–6^{(7–5)}, 3–6, [10–7]
2016	(Spain) Marcel Granollers (Poland) Marcin Matkowski	(South Africa) Raven Klaasen (United States) Rajeev Ram	6–2, 7–6^{(7–4)}
2017	(Japan) Ben McLachlan (Japan) Yasutaka Uchiyama	(United Kingdom) Jamie Murray (Brazil) Bruno Soares	6–4, 7–6^{(7–1)}
2018	(Japan) Ben McLachlan (Germany) Jan-Lennard Struff	(South Africa) Raven Klaasen (New Zealand) Michael Venus	6–4, 7–5
2019	(France) Nicolas Mahut (France) Édouard Roger-Vasselin	(Croatia) Nikola Mektić (Croatia) Franko Škugor	7–6^{(9–7)}, 6–4
2020	no competition (due to COVID-19 pandemic)		
2021	no competition (due to COVID-19 pandemic)		
2022	(United States) Mackenzie McDonald (Brazil) Marcelo Melo	(Brazil) Rafael Matos (Spain) David Vega Hernández	6–4, 3–6, [10–4]
2023	(Australia) Rinky Hijikata (Australia) Max Purcell	(United Kingdom) Jamie Murray (New Zealand) Michael Venus	6–4, 6–1
2024	(United Kingdom) Julian Cash (United Kingdom) Lloyd Glasspool	(Uruguay) Ariel Behar (United States) Robert Galloway	6–4, 4–6, [12–10]
2025	(Monaco) Hugo Nys (France) Édouard Roger-Vasselin	(India) Rohan Bopanna (Japan) Takeru Yuzuki	7–5, 7–5
2026	(United States) Austin Krajicek (Croatia) Nikola Mektić	(France) Théo Arribagé (France) Albano Olivetti	7–6^{(7–5)}, 5–7, [10–6]

=== Women's doubles ===
Year	Champions	Runners-up	Score
1979– 1989	not available		
1990	(United States) Kathy Jordan (Australia) Elizabeth Smylie	(United States) Hu Na (Australia) Michelle Jaggard	6–0, 3–6, 6–1
1991	(United States) Amy Frazier (Japan) Maya Kidowaki	(Japan) Yone Kamio (Japan) Akiko Kijimuta	6–2, 6–4
1992	(United States) Amy Frazier (Japan) Rika Hiraki	(Japan) Kimiko Date (United States) Stephanie Rehe	5–7, 7–6^{(7–5)}, 6–0
1993	(Japan) Ei Iida (Japan) Maya Kidowaki	(China) Li Fang (Japan) Kyōko Nagatsuka	6–2, 4–6, 6–4
1994	(Japan) Mami Donoshiro (Japan) Ai Sugiyama	(Indonesia) Yayuk Basuki (Japan) Nana Miyagi	6–4, 6–1
1995	(Japan) Miho Saeki (Japan) Yuka Yoshida	(Japan) Kyōko Nagatsuka (Japan) Ai Sugiyama	6–7, 6–4, 7–6
1996	(Japan) Kimiko Date (Japan) Ai Sugiyama	(United States) Amy Frazier (United States) Kimberly Po	7–6, 6–7, 6–3
1997	(France) Alexia Dechaume-Balleret (Japan) Rika Hiraki	(Australia) Kerry-Anne Guse (United States) Corina Morariu	6–4, 6–2
1998	(Japan) Naoko Kijimuta (Japan) Nana Miyagi	(United States) Amy Frazier (Japan) Rika Hiraki	6–3, 4–6, 6–4
1999	(United States) Corina Morariu (United States) Kimberly Po	(Australia) Catherine Barclay (Australia) Kerry-Anne Guse	6–3, 6–2
2000	(France) Julie Halard-Decugis (United States) Corina Morariu	(Slovenia) Tina Križan (Slovenia) Katarina Srebotnik	6–1, 6–2
2001	(South Africa) Liezel Huber (Australia) Rachel McQuillan	(Chinese Taipei) Janet Lee (Indonesia) Wynne Prakusya	6–2, 6–0
2002	(Japan) Shinobu Asagoe (Japan) Nana Miyagi	(Russia) Svetlana Kuznetsova (Spain) Arantxa Sánchez Vicario	6–4, 4–6, 6–4
2003	(Russia) Maria Sharapova (Thailand) Tamarine Tanasugarn	(United States) Ansley Cargill (United States) Ashley Harkleroad	7–6^{(7–1)}, 6–0
2004	(Japan) Shinobu Asagoe (Slovenia) Katarina Srebotnik	(United States) Jennifer Hopkins (United States) Mashona Washington	6–1, 6–4
2005	(Argentina) Gisela Dulko (Russia) Maria Kirilenko	(Japan) Shinobu Asagoe (Venezuela) María Vento-Kabchi	7–5, 4–6, 6–3
2006	(United States) Vania King (Croatia) Jelena Kostanić	(Chinese Taipei) Chan Yung-jan (Chinese Taipei) Chuang Chia-jung	7–6^{(7–2)}, 5–7, 6–2
2007	(China) Sun Tiantian (China) Yan Zi	(Chinese Taipei) Chuang Chia-jung (United States) Vania King	1–6, 6–2, [10–6]
2008	(United States) Jill Craybas (New Zealand) Marina Erakovic	(Japan) Ayumi Morita (Japan) Aiko Nakamura	4–6, 7–5, [10–6]
2009	see Japan Women's Open		

== See also ==
- Pan Pacific Open – women's tournament (since 1973)
- Japan Women's Open – women's tournament (since 2009)
