= Aisam-ul-Haq Qureshi career statistics =

Career finals
Discipline	Type	Won	Lost	Total
Doubles	Grand Slam	0	1	1
Doubles	ATP Finals	–	–	0
Doubles	ATP 1000	2	1	3
Doubles	ATP 500	2	3	5
Doubles	ATP 250	14	17	31
Doubles	Total	18	24	42
Mixed	Grand Slam	0	1	1
Mixed	Total	0	1	1

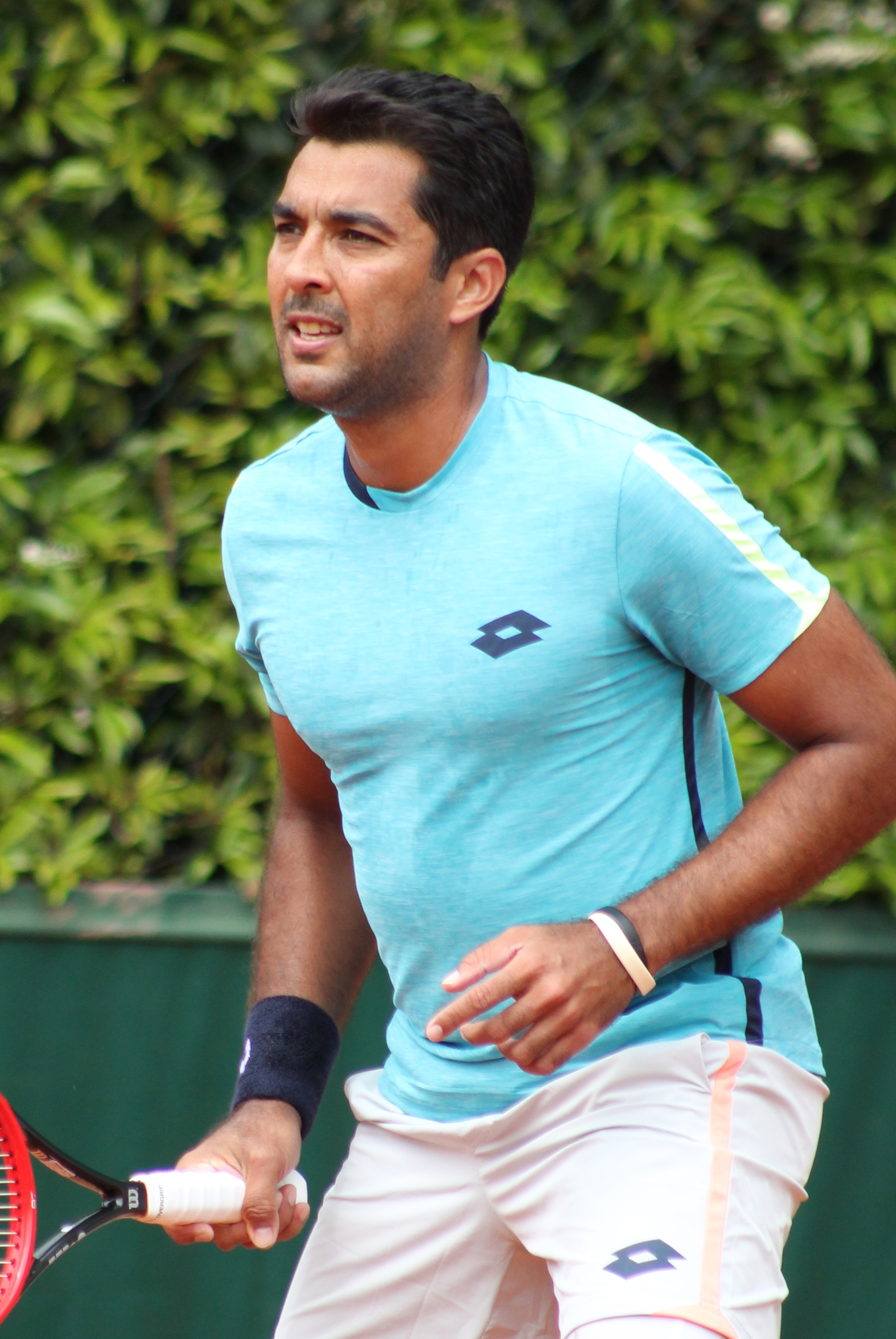
Qureshi has reached two major finals, both at the 2010 US Open in the men's doubles and the mixed doubles.

Aisam-ul-Haq Qureshi is a professional tennis player who is the current Pakistani number one doubles player. He has reached two major finals in total: (1 Doubles, 1 Mixed), both at the 2010 US Open. Qureshi has been ranked as high as world No. 8 in the ATP doubles rankings.

Qureshi made his professional tennis debut on the main tour at the Chennai Open in 2001. So far in his career, Qureshi has won a total of 18 doubles titles.

Below is a list of career achievements and titles won by Aisam-ul-Haq Qureshi.

== Career performance timeline ==
Source for the following tables:

Key
W	F	SF	QF	#R	RR	Q#	P#	DNQ	A	Z#	PO	G	S	B	NMS	NTI	P	NH

(W) winner; (F) finalist; (SF) semifinalist; (QF) quarterfinalist; (#R) rounds 4, 3, 2, 1; (RR) round-robin stage; (Q#) qualification round; (P#) preliminary round; (DNQ) did not qualify; (A) absent; (Z#) Davis/Fed Cup Zonal Group (with number indication) or (PO) play-off; (G) gold, (S) silver or (B) bronze Olympic/Paralympic medal; (NMS) not a Masters tournament; (NTI) not a Tier I tournament; (P) postponed; (NH) not held; (SR) strike rate (events won / competed); (W–L) win–loss record.
To avoid confusion and double counting, these charts are updated at the conclusion of a tournament or when the player's participation has ended.

=== Singles ===
Tournament	2000	2001	2002	2003	2004	2005	2006	2007	2008	SR	W–L	Win %
Australian Open	A	Q1	Q2	A	A	Q1	A	A	Q1	0 / 0	0–0	–
French Open	A	A	A	A	A	A	A	A	A	0 / 0	0–0	–
Wimbledon	Q1	Q2	Q3	A	A	Q1	A	2R	Q3	0 / 1	1–1	50%
US Open	Q1	Q2	Q1	A	Q2	A	A	Q3	1R	0 / 1	0–1	0%
Win–loss	0–0	0–0	0–0	0–0	0–0	0–0	0–0	1–1	0–1	0 / 2	1–2	33%

=== Doubles ===
Tournament	2002	2003	2004	2005	2006	2007	2008	2009	2010	2011	2012	2013	2014	2015	2016	2017	2018	2019	2020	2021	2022	2023	2024	2025	SR	W–L	W%
Grand Slam Tournaments
Australian Open	absent								1R	3R	3R	3R	3R	3R	1R	2R	QF	1R	1R	2R	2R	3R	A	A	0 / 13	15–13	54%
French Open	A	1R	absent				1R	A	2R	QF	SF	3R	2R	1R	3R	1R	1R	1R	1R	2R	1R	absent			0 / 15	14–15	48%
Wimbledon	3R	1R	absent				2R	3R	QF	1R	3R	3R	2R	2R	2R	3R	2R	3R	NH	3R	2R	absent			0 / 16	23–16	59%
US Open	2R	absent					1R	2R	F	SF	SF	QF	1R	2R	QF	1R	1R	1R	1R	3R	2R	absent			0 / 16	24–16	60%
Win–loss	3–2	0–2	0–0	0–0	0–0	0–0	1–3	3–2	9–4	9–4	11–4	9–4	4–4	4–4	6–4	3–4	3–4	2–4	0–3	6–4	3−4	2–1	0–0	0–0	0 / 61	78–61	56%
Year-end championship
ATP Finals	did not qualify									RR	RR	RR	did not qualify												0 / 3	0–9	0%
ATP Masters 1000
Indian Wells Open	absent									SF	1R	1R	1R	1R	1R	2R	2R	absent							0 / 8	5–8	38%
Miami Open	absent									QF	2R	W	2R	A	2R	1R	1R	A	NH	QF	absent				1 / 8	12–7	63%
Monte-Carlo Masters	absent									SF	1R	QF	QF	A	A	2R	1R	A	NH	absent					0 / 6	6–6	50%
Hamburg Masters	absent							Held as Madrid (Clay)																	0 / 0	0–0	–
Madrid Open	Held as Hamburg							A	A	QF	QF	2R	QF	A	A	1R	1R	A	NH	absent					0 / 6	3–6	33%
Italian Open	absent										2R	2R	2R	A	A	2R	2R	A	1R	absent					0 / 6	3–6	33%
Canadian Open	absent									QF	QF	QF	2R	A	A	1R	A	A	NH	absent					0 / 5	3–5	38%
Cincinnati Open	absent								2R	QF	QF	2R	1R	A	A	1R	absent								0 / 6	3–6	33%
Madrid Open (Hard)	absent							Held as Shanghai																	0 / 0	0–0	–
Shanghai Masters	not held							A	QF	2R	QF	QF	1R	A	A	2R	1R	A	not held			absent			0 / 7	5–7	42%
Paris Masters	absent								2R	W	F	QF	A	2R	QF	1R	2R	1R	A	1R	absent				1 / 10	12–9	57%
Win–loss	0–0	0–0	0–0	0–0	0–0	0–0	0–0	0–0	3–3	14–7	9–9	8–8	5–8	1–2	3–3	4–9	3–7	0–1	0–1	2–2	0–0	0–0	0–0	0–0	2 / 62	52–60	46%
National representation
Davis Cup	Z2	Z1	Z1	PO	Z1	A	Z3	Z2	Z2	Z2	Z2	Z2	Z2	Z2	Z1	Z2	Z1	A	WG1		WG1	WG2	WG2	WG2	0 / 20	29–13	69%
Career statistics
Titles	0	0	0	0	0	0	0	0	1	4	2	2	1	1	0	5	0	1	1	0	0	0	0	0	18		
Finals	0	0	0	0	0	1	1	0	6	4	3	4	3	3	2	6	1	2	2	2	2	0	0	0	42		
Win–Loss	6–2	1–5	1–0	2–1	2–2	2–2	9–13	8–8	39–22	43–28	36–27	30–28	27–23	30–25	22–27	35–25	22–31	16–22	13–11	19–21	23–22	5–9	0–2	0–1	394–359		
Win (%)	75%	17%	100%	67%	50%	50%	41%	50%	64%	61%	57%	52%	54%	55%	45%	58%	42%	42%	54%	48%	51%	36%	0%	0%	52%		
Year–end ranking	107	172	134	181	380	90	89	59	18	9	14	15	34	37	40	31	47	52	50	50	64	126	694	1,105	$3,732,239		

=== Mixed doubles ===
Tournament	2010	2011	2012	2013	2014	2015	2016	2017	2018	2019	2020	2021	2022	SR	W–L	Win %
Australian Open	A	1R	QF	1R	QF	1R	2R	1R	1R	A	A	A	QF	0 / 9	7–9	38%
French Open	2R	2R	1R	SF	A	QF	1R	1R	1R	SF	NH	A	A	0 / 9	10–9	53%
Wimbledon	1R	2R	2R	3R	SF	1R	SF	2R	2R	3R	NH	2R	A	0 / 11	0–11	48%
US Open	F	A	1R	1R	2R	A	1R	2R	1R	A	NH	A	A	0 / 7	6–7	46%
Win–loss	5–3	1–3	2–4	4–4	6–3	2–3	4–4	1–4	1–4	5–2	0–0	0–1	2–1	0 / 36	34–36	49%

== Grand Slam tournament finals ==
=== Doubles: 1 (1 runner-up) ===
Result	Year	Championship	Surface	Partner	Opponents	Score
Loss	2010	US Open	Hard	(India) Rohan Bopanna	(United States) Bob Bryan (United States) Mike Bryan	6–7^{(5–7)}, 6–7^{(4–7)}

=== Mixed doubles: 1 (1 runner-up) ===
Result	Year	Championship	Surface	Partner	Opponents	Score
Loss	2010	US Open	Hard	(Czech Republic) Květa Peschke	(United States) Liezel Huber (United States) Bob Bryan	4–6, 4–6

== Other finals ==
=== Masters 1000 finals ===
==== Doubles: 3 (2 titles, 1 runner-up) ====
Result	Year	Tournament	Surface	Partner	Opponents	Score
Win	2011	Paris Masters	Hard (i)	(India) Rohan Bopanna	(France) Julien Benneteau (France) Nicolas Mahut	6–2, 6–4
Loss	2012	Paris Masters	Hard (i)	(Netherlands) Jean-Julien Rojer	(India) Mahesh Bhupathi (India) Rohan Bopanna	6–7^{(6–8)}, 3–6
Win	2013	Miami Open	Hard	(Netherlands) Jean-Julien Rojer	(Poland) Mariusz Fyrstenberg (Poland) Marcin Matkowski	6–4, 6–1

== ATP career finals ==
=== Doubles: 42 (18 titles, 24 runner-ups) ===
Legend Grand Slam Tournaments (0–1) ATP World Tour Finals (–) ATP World Tour Masters 1000 (2–1) ATP World Tour 500 Series (2–3) ATP World Tour 250 Series (14–19)	Finals by Surface Hard (10–14) Clay (3–9) Grass (5–1)	Titles by setting Outdoor (13–17) Indoor (5–7)

Result	W–L	Date	Tournament	Tier	Surface	Partner	Opponents	Score
Loss	0–1	Sep 2007	Mumbai Open, India	Intl Series	Hard	(India) Rohan Bopanna	(Sweden) Robert Lindstedt (Finland) Jarkko Nieminen	6–7^{(3–7)}, 6–7^{(5–7)}
Loss	0–2	Jul 2008	Hall of Fame Open, US	Intl Series	Grass	(India) Rohan Bopanna	(United States) Mardy Fish (United States) John Isner	4–6, 6–7^{(1–7)}
Win	1–2	Feb 2010	SA Tennis Open, South Africa	250 Series	Hard	(India) Rohan Bopanna	(Slovakia) Karol Beck (Israel) Harel Levy	2–6, 6–3, [10–5]
Loss	1–3	Apr 2010	Grand Prix Hassan II, Morocco	250 Series	Clay	(India) Rohan Bopanna	(Sweden) Robert Lindstedt (Romania) Horia Tecău	2–6, 6–3, [7–10]
Loss	1–4	May 2010	Open de Nice Côte d'Azur, France	250 Series	Clay	(India) Rohan Bopanna	(Brazil) Marcelo Melo (Brazil) Bruno Soares	6–1, 3–6, [5–10]
Loss	1–5	Aug 2010	Connecticut Open, US	250 Series	Hard	(India) Rohan Bopanna	(Sweden) Robert Lindstedt (Romania) Horia Tecău	4–6, 5–7
Loss	1–6	Sep 2010	US Open, New York City, US	Grand Slam	Hard	(India) Rohan Bopanna	(United States) Mike Bryan (United States) Bob Bryan	6–7^{(5–7)}, 6–7^{(4–7)}
Loss	1–7	Sep 2010	St. Petersburg Open, Russia	250 Series	Hard (i)	(India) Rohan Bopanna	(Italy) Daniele Bracciali (Italy) Potito Starace	6–7^{(6–8)}, 6–7^{(5–7)}
Win	2–7	Jun 2011	Halle Open, Germany	250 Series	Grass	(India) Rohan Bopanna	(Netherlands) Robin Haase (Canada) Milos Raonic	7–6^{(10–8)}, 3–6, [11–9]
Win	3–7	Oct 2011	Thailand Open, Thailand	250 Series	Hard (i)	(Austria) Oliver Marach	(Germany) Michael Kohlmann (Germany) Alexander Waske	7–6^{(7–4)}, 7–6^{(7–5)}
Win	4–7	Oct 2011	Stockholm Open, Sweden	250 Series	Hard (i)	(India) Rohan Bopanna	(Brazil) Marcelo Melo (Brazil) Bruno Soares	6–1, 6–3
Win	5–7	Nov 2011	Paris Masters, France	Masters 1000	Hard (i)	(India) Rohan Bopanna	(France) Julien Benneteau (France) Nicolas Mahut	6–2, 6–4
Win	6–7	May 2012	Estoril Open, Portugal	250 Series	Clay	(Netherlands) Jean-Julien Rojer	(Austria) Julian Knowle (Spain) David Marrero	7–5, 7–5
Win	7–7	Jun 2012	Halle Open, Germany (2)	250 Series	Grass	(Netherlands) Jean-Julien Rojer	(Philippines) Treat Conrad Huey (United States) Scott Lipsky	6–3, 6–4
Loss	7–8	Nov 2012	Paris Masters, France	Masters 1000	Hard (i)	(Netherlands) Jean-Julien Rojer	(India) Mahesh Bhupathi (India) Rohan Bopanna	6–7^{(6–8)}, 3–6
Loss	7–9	Feb 2013	Open 13, France	250 Series	Hard (i)	(Netherlands) Jean-Julien Rojer	(India) Rohan Bopanna (United Kingdom) Colin Fleming	4–6, 6–7^{(3–7)}
Win	8–9	Mar 2013	Miami Open, US	Masters 1000	Hard	(Netherlands) Jean-Julien Rojer	(Poland) Mariusz Fyrstenberg (Poland) Marcin Matkowski	6–4, 6–1
Loss	8–10	May 2013	Portugal Open, Portugal	250 Series	Clay	(Netherlands) Jean-Julien Rojer	(Mexico) Santiago González (United States) Scott Lipsky	3–6, 6–4, [7–10]
Win	9–10	Oct 2013	Stockholm Open, Sweden (2)	250 Series	Hard (i)	(Netherlands) Jean-Julien Rojer	(Sweden) Jonas Björkman (Sweden) Robert Lindstedt	6–2, 6–2
Loss	9–11	Jan 2014	Sydney International, Australia	250 Series	Hard	(India) Rohan Bopanna	(Canada) Daniel Nestor (Serbia) Nenad Zimonjić	6–7^{(3–7)}, 6–7^{(3–7)}
Win	10–11	Mar 2014	Dubai Tennis Championships, UAE	500 Series	Hard	(India) Rohan Bopanna	(Canada) Daniel Nestor (Serbia) Nenad Zimonjić	6–4, 6–3
Loss	10–12	May 2014	Open de Nice Côte d'Azur, France (2)	250 Series	Clay	(India) Rohan Bopanna	(Slovakia) Martin Kližan (Austria) Philipp Oswald	2–6, 0–6
Loss	10–13	Mar 2015	Dubai Tennis Championships, UAE	500 Series	Hard	(Serbia) Nenad Zimonjić	(India) Rohan Bopanna (Canada) Daniel Nestor	4–6, 1–6
Win	11–13	Jul 2015	Hall of Fame Open, US	250 Series	Grass	(United Kingdom) Jonathan Marray	(United States) Nicholas Monroe (Croatia) Mate Pavić	4–6, 6–3, [10–8]
Loss	11–14	Aug 2015	Swiss Open, Switzerland	250 Series	Clay	(Austria) Oliver Marach	(Belarus) Aliaksandr Bury (Uzbekistan) Denis Istomin	6–3, 2–6, [5–10]
Loss	11–15	Apr 2016	Grand Prix Hassan II, Morocco (2)	250 Series	Clay	(Croatia) Marin Draganja	(Argentina) Guillermo Durán (Argentina) Máximo González	2–6, 6–3, [6–10]
Loss	11–16	Jul 2016	German Open, Germany	500 Series	Clay	(Canada) Daniel Nestor	(Finland) Henri Kontinen (Australia) John Peers	5–7, 3–6
Win	12–16	Jan 2017	Auckland Open, New Zealand	250 Series	Hard	(Poland) Marcin Matkowski	(Israel) Jonathan Erlich (United States) Scott Lipsky	1–6, 6–2, [10–3]
Win	13–16	Apr 2017	Barcelona Open, Spain	500 Series	Clay	(Romania) Florin Mergea	(Germany) Philipp Petzschner (Austria) Alexander Peya	6–4, 6–3
Win	14–16	Jun 2017	Antalya Open, Turkey	250 Series	Grass	(Sweden) Robert Lindstedt	(Austria) Oliver Marach (Croatia) Mate Pavić	7–5, 4–1 ret.
Win	15–16	Jul 2017	Hall of Fame Open, US (2)	250 Series	Grass	(United States) Rajeev Ram	(Australia) Matt Reid (Australia) John-Patrick Smith	6–4, 4–6, [10–7]
Win	16–16	Oct 2017	Chengdu Open, China	250 Series	Hard	(Israel) Jonathan Erlich	(New Zealand) Marcus Daniell (Brazil) Marcelo Demoliner	6–3, 7–6^{(7–3)}
Loss	16–17	Oct 2017	Stockholm Open, Sweden	250 Series	Hard (i)	(Netherlands) Jean-Julien Rojer	(Austria) Oliver Marach (Croatia) Mate Pavić	6–3, 6–7^{(6–8)}, [4–10]
Loss	16–18	Apr 2018	Barcelona Open, Spain	500 Series	Clay	(Netherlands) Jean-Julien Rojer	(Spain) Feliciano López (Spain) Marc López	6–7^{(5–7)}, 4–6
Loss	16–19	Feb 2019	New York Open, US	250 Series	Hard (i)	(Mexico) Santiago González	(Germany) Kevin Krawietz (Germany) Andreas Mies	4–6, 5–7
Win	17–19	Apr 2019	U.S. Men's Clay Court Championships, US	250 Series	Clay	(Mexico) Santiago González	(United Kingdom) Ken Skupski (United Kingdom) Neal Skupski	3–6, 6–4, [10–6]
Loss	17–20	Feb 2020	Open Sud de France, France	250 Series	Hard (i)	(United Kingdom) Dominic Inglot	(Serbia) Nikola Ćaćić (Croatia) Mate Pavić	4–6, 7–6^{(7–4)}, [4–10]
Win	18–20	Feb 2020	New York Open, US	250 Series	Hard (i)	(United Kingdom) Dominic Inglot	(United States) Steve Johnson (United States) Reilly Opelka	7–6^{(7–5)}, 7–6^{(8–6)}
Loss	18–21	May 2021	Emilia-Romagna Open, Italy	250 Series	Clay	(Austria) Oliver Marach	(Italy) Simone Bolelli (Argentina) Máximo González	3–6, 3–6
Loss	18–22	Nov 2021	Stockholm Open, Sweden	250 Series	Hard (i)	(Netherlands) Jean-Julien Rojer	(Mexico) Santiago González (Argentina) Andrés Molteni	2–6, 2–6
Loss	18–23	Jan 2022	Melbourne Summer Set 1, Australia	250 Series	Hard	(Kazakhstan) Aleksandr Nedovyesov	(Netherlands) Wesley Koolhof (United Kingdom) Neal Skupski	4–6, 4–6
Loss	18–24	Feb 2022	Delray Beach Open, US	250 Series	Hard	(Kazakhstan) Aleksandr Nedovyesov	(El Salvador) Marcelo Arévalo (Netherlands) Jean-Julien Rojer	2–6, 7–6^{(7–5)}, [4–10]

== Other career finals ==
=== Singles ===
Result	No.	Date	Tournament	Surface	Opponent	Score
Win	1.	19 April 2005	Islamic Solidarity Games, Ta'if, Saudi Arabia	Hard	(Kuwait) Mohammed Al-Ghareeb	6–4, 4–6, 7–5

=== Doubles ===
Result	No.	Date	Tournament	Surface	Partner	Opponents	Score
Win	1.	19 April 2005	Islamic Solidarity Games, Ta'if, Saudi Arabia	Hard	(Pakistan) Aqeel Khan	(Indonesia) Prima Simpatiaji (Indonesia) Suwandi	7–6, 7–6

== Challengers and Futures finals ==
=== Singles: 22 (16–6) ===
Legend (singles) ATP Challenger Tour (1–1) ITF Futures Tour (15–5)	Titles by surface Hard (16–5) Clay (0–0) Grass (0–1) Carpet (0–0)

Result	W–L	Date	Tournament	Tier	Surface	Opponent	Score
Win	1–0	Oct 1999	Indonesia F5, Jakarta	Futures	Hard	(Thailand) Danai Udomchoke	5–7, 7–5, 6–3
Loss	1–1	Nov 1999	Thailand F2, Pattaya	Futures	Hard	(Thailand) Danai Udomchoke	4–6, 6–4, 2–6
Loss	1–2	Nov 1999	Vietnam F1, Ho Chi Minh City	Futures	Hard	(Japan) Yaoki Ishii	6–4, 1–6, 4–6
Win	2–2	Dec 1999	Bangladesh F1, Dhaka	Futures	Hard	(Slovakia) Viktor Bruthans	6–1, 6–4
Loss	2–3	Apr 2000	Uzbekistan F1, Andijan	Futures	Hard	(Israel) Lior Dahan	6–3, 3–6, 3–6
Win	3–3	Nov 2000	Vietnam F1, Ho Chi Minh City	Futures	Hard	(Czech Republic) Jaroslav Levinský	3–6, 6–2, 6–3
Win	4–3	Nov 2001	Thailand F2, Nonthaburi	Futures	Hard	(Chinese Taipei) Jimmy Wang	6–4, 4–6, 7–5
Win	5–3	Nov 2001	Vietnam F1, Hanoi	Futures	Hard	(Chinese Taipei) Lu Yen-hsun	6–4, 4–3 ret.
Loss	5–4	May 2003	Uzbekistan F3, Andijan	Futures	Hard	(Switzerland) Marco Chiudinelli	1–6, 6–7^{(4–7)}
Win	6–4	Nov 2003	Thailand F2, Nakhon Ratchasima	Futures	Hard	(Austria) Herbert Wiltschnig	6–3, 3–6, 6–2
Win	7–4	Nov 2003	India F6, Dehradun	Futures	Hard	(United Kingdom) Nick Crawley	6–1, 7–5
Win	8–4	Nov 2003	India F7, New Delhi	Futures	Hard	(India) Harsh Mankad	7–6^{(7–4)}, 6–4
Win	9–4	Feb 2004	India F1A, New Delhi	Futures	Hard	(Bulgaria) Todor Enev	6–3, 6–4
Loss	9–5	May 2004	Uzbekistan F4, Andijan	Futures	Hard	(United Kingdom) Jonathan Marray	6–7^{(3–7)}, 3–6
Win	10–5	May 2004	Saudi Arabia F2, Riyadh	Futures	Hard	(Portugal) Leonardo Tavares	6–4, 6–7^{(5–7)}, 6–3
Win	11–5	Oct 2004	Nigeria F5, Lagos	Futures	Hard	(Germany) Sebastian Fitz	2–6, 7–6^{(9–7)}, 6–3
Win	12–5	Dec 2005	India F7, Chandigarh	Futures	Hard	(Germany) Frank Moser	7–6^{(8–6)}, 6–7^{(5–7)}, 6–4
Win	13–5	Dec 2006	India F3, Delhi	Futures	Hard	(India) Rohan Bopanna	2–6, 6–3, 6–3
Win	14–5	Apr 2007	United Arab Emirates F1, Dubai	Futures	Hard	(Republic of Ireland) Louk Sorensen	6–3, 6–3
Win	15–5	May 2007	Kuwait F2, Meshref	Futures	Hard	(France) Thomas Oger	7–6^{(8–6)}, 3–6, 6–3
Loss	15–6	Jul 2007	Nottingham, Great Britain	Challenger	Grass	(Australia) Alun Jones	3–6, 6–4, 4–6
Win	16–6	Dec 2007	New Delhi, India	Challenger	Hard	(South Korea) An Jae-sung	7–5, 6–4

=== Doubles: 87 (47–40) ===
Legend (doubles) ATP Challenger Tour (30–29) ITF Futures Tour (17–11)	Titles by surface Hard (33–28) Clay (3–3) Grass (7–4) Carpet (4–5)

Result	W–L	Date	Tournament	Tier	Surface	Partner	Opponents	Score
Loss	0–1	Oct 1998	Japan F3, Fukuoka	Futures	Carpet	(Chinese Taipei) Cheng Wei-jen	(Chinese Taipei) Chen Chih-jung (Chinese Taipei) Lin Bing-chao	3–6, 6–3, 1–6
Loss	0–2	Jul 1999	Greece F4, Alexandroupolis	Futures	Carpet	(Chile) Fernando González	(Bulgaria) Ivaylo Traykov (Bulgaria) Milen Velev	6–7, 6–7
Win	1–2	Jul 1999	Turkey F2, Istanbul	Futures	Hard	(Uzbekistan) Dmitriy Tomashevich	(Australia) Michael Logarzo (Australia) Joseph Sirianni	6–3, 2–6, 7–5
Win	2–2	Jul 1999	Turkey F3, Istanbul	Futures	Hard	(Uzbekistan) Dmitriy Tomashevich	(Canada) Emin Agaev (Israel) Andy Ram	7–6^{(7–4)}, 6–4
Win	3–2	Nov 1999	Vietnam F1, Ho Chi Minh City	Futures	Hard	(New Zealand) Mark Nielsen	(Poland) Bartłomiej Dąbrowski (Poland) Piotr Szczepanik	w/o
Loss	3–3	Jan 2000	India F2, Bangalore	Futures	Clay	(United Kingdom) Miles Maclagan	(Israel) Andy Ram (Israel) Nir Welgreen	6–2, 3–6, 4–6
Loss	3–4	Apr 2000	Uzbekistan F1, Andijan	Futures	Hard	(Uzbekistan) Dmitriy Tomashevich	(Israel) Jonathan Erlich (Israel) Lior Mor	6–7^{(4–7)}, 4–6
Win	4–4	Aug 2000	Wrexham, Great Britain	Challenger	Hard	(Italy) Daniele Bracciali	(United Kingdom) Miles Maclagan (United Kingdom) Andrew Richardson	6–4, 6–2
Loss	4–5	Oct 2000	France F19, Plaisir	Futures	Hard (i)	(Israel) Noam Behr	(France) Julien Benneteau (France) Nicolas Mahut	3–6, 6–7^{(5–7)}
Win	5–5	Oct 2000	France F20, Nevers	Futures	Hard (i)	(Israel) Noam Behr	(Canada) Dave Abelson (Czech Republic) Martin Štěpánek	6–2, 6–1
Loss	5–6	Oct 2000	Bukhara, Uzbekistan	Challenger	Hard	(Israel) Noam Behr	(Uzbekistan) Vadim Kutsenko (Uzbekistan) Oleg Ogorodov	4–6, 6–7^{(5–7)}
Win	6–6	Nov 2000	Vietnam F1, Ho Chi Minh City	Futures	Hard	(Australia) Ashley Fisher	(Czech Republic) Jaroslav Levinský (Czech Republic) Michal Navrátil	6–4, 6–4
Win	7–6	Dec 2000	Prague, Czech Republic	Challenger	Hard (i)	(Denmark) Kristian Pless	(Switzerland) Ivo Heuberger (Finland) Ville Liukko	6–4, 6–4
Loss	7–7	Aug 2001	Wrexham, Great Britain	Challenger	Hard	(Australia) Luke Bourgeois	(Belgium) Gilles Elseneer (Germany) Alexander Popp	7–5, 5–7, 2–6
Win	8–7	Oct 2001	Bukhara, Uzbekistan	Challenger	Hard	(Netherlands) Rogier Wassen	(Kazakhstan) Alexey Kedryuk (Belarus) Alexander Shvets	6–2, 6–4
Win	9–7	Dec 2001	Bangkok, Thailand	Challenger	Hard	(Czech Republic) Jaroslav Levinský	(Australia) Jaymon Crabb (Australia) Peter Luczak	6–3, 6–7^{(5–7)}, 7–6^{(7–5)}
Win	10–7	May 2002	Uzbekistan F3, Andijan	Futures	Hard	(Finland) Tuomas Ketola	(South Africa) Rik de Voest (South Africa) Dirk Stegmann	7–6^{(7–0)}, 6–3
Loss	10–8	May 2002	Uzbekistan F4, Namangan	Futures	Hard	(Finland) Tuomas Ketola	(South Africa) Rik de Voest (South Africa) Dirk Stegmann	5–7, 4–6
Loss	10–9	May 2002	Fergana, Uzbekistan	Challenger	Hard	(Finland) Tuomas Ketola	(South Africa) Rik de Voest (South Africa) Dirk Stegmann	3–6, 5–7
Win	11–9	Jul 2002	Bristol, Great Britain	Challenger	Grass	(Australia) Dejan Petrović	(Italy) Daniele Bracciali (Italy) Gianluca Pozzi	6–3, 6–2
Win	12–9	Jul 2002	Manchester, Great Britain	Challenger	Grass	(Slovakia) Karol Beck	(Hong Kong) John Hui (Australia) Anthony Ross	6–3, 7–6^{(7–2)}
Win	13–9	Jul 2002	Hilversum, Netherlands	Challenger	Clay	(Italy) Stefano Pescosolido	(Hong Kong) John Hui (Australia) Anthony Ross	7–6^{(7–4)}, 6–0
Loss	13–10	Aug 2002	Wrexham, Great Britain	Challenger	Hard	(Italy) Daniele Bracciali	(Italy) Stefano Pescosolido (Italy) Gianluca Pozzi	4–6, 4–6
Loss	13–11	Jan 2003	USA F1, Tampa	Futures	Hard	(France) Benjamin Cassaigne	(Canada) Frank Dancevic (Canada) Simon Larose	3–6, 4–6
Loss	13–12	Feb 2003	Wolfsburg, Germany	Challenger	Carpet (i)	(Austria) Alexander Peya	(Germany) Karsten Braasch (Germany) Axel Pretzsch	4–6, 2–6
Loss	13–13	Apr 2003	Qatar F2, Doha	Futures	Hard	(Germany) Ivo Klec	(United Kingdom) Jonathan Marray (United Kingdom) David Sherwood	6–3, 2–6, 6–7^{(3–7)}
Win	14–13	May 2003	Uzbekistan F4, Namangan	Futures	Hard	(South Africa) Justin Bower	(Switzerland) Yves Allegro (Switzerland) Marco Chiudinelli	6–7^{(5–7)}, 7–6^{(7–2)}, 6–1
Win	15–13	May 2003	Fergana, Uzbekistan	Challenger	Hard	(South Africa) Justin Bower	(Kazakhstan) Alexey Kedryuk (Ukraine) Orest Tereshchuk	3–6, 7–6^{(7–0)}, 6–4
Win	16–13	Aug 2003	Denver, USA	Challenger	Hard	(India) Rohan Bopanna	(Brazil) Josh Goffi (United States) Jason Marshall	4–6, 6–3, 6–4
Win	17–13	Nov 2003	India F7, New Delhi	Futures	Hard	(India) Harsh Mankad	(India) Mustafa Ghouse (India) Vishal Uppal	3–6, 6–1, 6–3
Win	18–13	Dec 2003	India F8, Mumbai	Futures	Hard	(India) Mustafa Ghouse	(India) Ajay Ramaswami (India) Sunil-Kumar Sipaeya	7–6^{(8–6)}, 2–6, 7–5
Win	19–13	Apr 2004	Salinas, Ecuador	Challenger	Hard	(Argentina) Federico Browne	(Venezuela) José de Armas (United States) Eric Nunez	6–3, 6–3
Loss	19–14	May 2004	Fergana, Uzbekistan	Challenger	Hard	(India) Harsh Mankad	(South Africa) Raven Klaasen (Netherlands Antilles) Jean-Julien Rojer	3–6, 1–6
Loss	19–15	May 2004	Saudi Arabia F2, Riyadh	Futures	Hard	(India) Mustafa Ghouse	(Germany) Sebastian Fitz (Egypt) Karim Maamoun	4–6, 4–6
Win	20–15	Jun 2004	Andorra, Andorra	Challenger	Hard	(Luxembourg) Gilles Müller	(Mexico) Santiago González (Mexico) Alejandro Hernández	6–3, 7–5
Loss	20–16	Jul 2004	Manchester, Great Britain	Challenger	Grass	(Croatia) Lovro Zovko	(France) Jean-François Bachelot (France) Nicolas Mahut	2–6, 4–6
Loss	20–17	Jul 2004	Valladolid, Spain	Challenger	Hard	(Sweden) Michael Ryderstedt	(France) Jean-François Bachelot (France) Nicolas Mahut	3–6, 4–6
Loss	20–18	Feb 2005	Wolfsburg, Germany	Challenger	Carpet (i)	(Croatia) Lovro Zovko	(Germany) Philipp Petzschner (Austria) Alexander Peya	2–6, 4–6
Loss	20–19	Mar 2005	Ho Chi Minh City, Vietnam	Challenger	Hard	(Ukraine) Orest Tereshchuk	(United States) Cecil Mamiit (United States) Eric Taino	3–6, 6–2, 4–6
Loss	20–20	Jul 2005	Nottingham, Great Britain	Challenger	Grass	(France) Jean-Michel Pequery	(United Kingdom) Josh Goodall (United Kingdom) Martin Lee	4–6, 6–7^{(0–7)}
Win	21–20	Aug 2005	Pamplona, Spain	Challenger	Hard	(Croatia) Lovro Zovko	(United Kingdom) James Auckland (United Kingdom) Daniel Kiernan	2–6, 6–3, 6–4
Loss	21–21	Mar 2006	Great Britain F3, Sunderland	Futures	Hard (i)	(France) Jean-François Bachelot	(Italy) Alessandro Motti (Spain) Daniel Muñoz de la Nava	3–6, 4–6
Win	22–21	Mar 2006	Great Britain F4, Manchester	Futures	Hard (i)	(France) Jean-François Bachelot	(United Kingdom) Martin Lee (United Kingdom) David Sherwood	6–1, 3–6, 6–2
Loss	22–22	Aug 2006	Bukhara, Uzbekistan	Challenger	Hard	(India) Rohan Bopanna	(France) Nicolas Renavand (France) Nicolas Tourte	6–2, 3–6, [8–10]
Loss	22–23	Feb 2007	France F3, Bressuire	Futures	Hard (i)	(France) Alexandre Renard	(France) Adrian Mannarino (France) Josselin Ouanna	7–6^{(7–5)}, 3–6, 5–7
Win	23–23	Feb 2007	Great Britain F3, Barnstaple	Futures	Hard (i)	(France) Stéphane Robert	(United States) Philip Stolt (Germany) Lars Uebel	6–2, 6–3
Win	24–23	Feb 2007	Great Britain F3, Exmouth	Futures	Carpet (i)	(India) Purav Raja	(United Kingdom) Neil Bamford (United Kingdom) Jim May	7–6^{(7–4)}, 6–3
Win	25–23	Mar 2007	Great Britain F5, Jersey	Futures	Hard (i)	(United Kingdom) Jamie Baker	(United Kingdom) Josh Goodall (United Kingdom) Ross Hutchins	6–2, 7–6^{(7–2)}
Win	26–23	Mar 2007	Great Britain F6, Sunderland	Futures	Hard (i)	(United Kingdom) Jamie Baker	(Australia) Andrew Coelho (Australia) Sam Groth	6–3, 3–6, 6–3
Win	27–23	Apr 2007	United Arab Emirates F1, Dubai	Futures	Hard	(Australia) Rameez Junaid	(Canada) Pierre-Ludovic Duclos (Australia) Adam Feeney	6–4, 6–3
Win	28–23	Apr 2007	United Arab Emirates F2, Dubai	Futures	Hard	(Australia) Rameez Junaid	(Canada) Pierre-Ludovic Duclos (Netherlands) Antal van der Duim	6–1, 6–3
Win	29–23	May 2007	Kuwait F1, Meshref	Futures	Hard	(India) Purav Raja	(Kuwait) Mohammad Ghareeb (Australia) Greg Jones	2–6, 7–5, 6–2
Win	30–23	Jul 2007	Manchester, Great Britain	Challenger	Grass	(India) Rohan Bopanna	(Netherlands) Jesse Huta Galung (Sweden) Michael Ryderstedt	4–6, 6–3, [10–5]
Win	31–23	Jul 2007	Nottingham, Great Britain	Challenger	Grass	(India) Rohan Bopanna	(India) Mustafa Ghouse (United Kingdom) Josh Goodall	6–3, 7–6^{(7–5)}
Win	32–23	Aug 2007	Segovia, Spain	Challenger	Hard	(India) Rohan Bopanna	(Switzerland) Michel Kratochvil (Luxembourg) Gilles Müller	7–6^{(12–10)}, 6–3
Win	33–23	Aug 2007	Bronx, USA	Challenger	Hard	(India) Rohan Bopanna	(United States) Alberto Francis (United States) Phillip King	6–3, 2–6, [10–5]
Win	34–23	Oct 2007	Barnstaple, Great Britain	Challenger	Hard (i)	(Denmark) Frederik Nielsen	(Netherlands) Jasper Smit (Netherlands) Martijn van Haasteren	6–2, 6–7^{(4–7)}, [10–2]
Loss	34–24	Nov 2007	Kuala Lumpur, Malaysia	Challenger	Hard	(India) Rohan Bopanna	(Australia) Stephen Huss (South Africa) Wesley Moodie	6–7^{(10–12)}, 3–6
Loss	34–25	Dec 2007	New Delhi, India	Challenger	Hard	(India) Rohan Bopanna	(South Africa) Rik de Voest (South Africa) Wesley Moodie	4–6, 6–7^{(4–7)}
Loss	34–26	Jan 2008	Heilbronn, Germany	Challenger	Hard (i)	(Russia) Igor Kunitsyn	(South Africa) Rik de Voest (United States) Bobby Reynolds	6–7^{(2–7)}, 7–6^{(7–5)}, [4–10]
Loss	34–27	May 2008	Lanzarote, Spain	Challenger	Hard	(Luxembourg) Gilles Müller	(South Africa) Rik de Voest (Poland) Łukasz Kubot	2–6, 6–7^{(2–7)}
Win	35–27	Jul 2008	Dublin, Ireland	Challenger	Carpet (i)	(India) Prakash Amritraj	(United Kingdom) Jonathan Marray (Denmark) Frederik Nielsen	6–3, 7–6^{(8–6)}
Win	36–27	Aug 2008	Belo Horizonte, Brazil	Challenger	Hard	(Mexico) Santiago González	(Brazil) Daniel Dutra da Silva (Brazil) Caio Zampieri	6–3, 7–6^{(7–3)}
Win	37–27	Nov 2008	Toyota, Japan	Challenger	Hard (i)	(Denmark) Frederik Nielsen	(Chinese Taipei) Chen Ti (Poland) Grzegorz Panfil	7–5, 6–3
Loss	37–28	Feb 2009	Belgrade, Serbia	Challenger	Carpet (i)	(Croatia) Lovro Zovko	(Germany) Michael Kohlmann (Germany) Philipp Marx	6–3, 2–6, [8–10]
Win	38–28	Mar 2009	Kyoto, Japan	Challenger	Carpet (i)	(Austria) Martin Slanar	(Japan) Tatsuma Ito (Japan) Takao Suzuki	6–7^{(7–9)}, 7–6^{(7–3)}, [10–6]
Win	39–28	Mar 2009	Khorat, Thailand	Challenger	Hard	(India) Rohan Bopanna	(Thailand) Sanchai Ratiwatana (Thailand) Sonchat Ratiwatana	6–3, 6–7^{(5–7)}, [10–5]
Loss	39–29	May 2009	Fergana, Uzbekistan	Challenger	Hard	(Canada) Pierre-Ludovic Duclos	(Russia) Pavel Chekhov (Kazakhstan) Alexey Kedryuk	6–4, 3–6, [5–10]
Loss	39–30	May 2009	Karlsruhe, Germany	Challenger	Clay	(Poland) Tomasz Bednarek	(Australia) Rameez Junaid (Germany) Philipp Marx	5–7, 4–6
Loss	39–31	Oct 2009	Kolding, Denmark	Challenger	Hard (i)	(United Kingdom) Jonathan Marray	(Austria) Martin Fischer (Austria) Philipp Oswald	5–7, 3–6
Win	40–31	Nov 2009	Aachen, Germany	Challenger	Carpet (i)	(India) Rohan Bopanna	(Germany) Philipp Marx (Slovakia) Igor Zelenay	6–4, 7–6^{(8–6)}
Win	41–31	Nov 2009	Helsinki, Finland	Challenger	Hard (i)	(India) Rohan Bopanna	(Finland) Henri Kontinen (Finland) Jarkko Nieminen	6–2, 7–6^{(9–7)}
Loss	41–32	Apr 2010	Napoli, Italy	Challenger	Clay	(United Kingdom) Jonathan Marray	(Jamaica) Dustin Brown (United States) Jesse Witten	6–7^{(4–7)}, 5–7
Win	42–32	May 2015	Aix-en-Provence, France	Challenger	Clay	(Netherlands) Robin Haase	(United States) Nicholas Monroe (New Zealand) Artem Sitak	6–1, 6–2
Win	43–32	Mar 2016	Irving, USA	Challenger	Hard	(United States) Nicholas Monroe	(Australia) Chris Guccione (Brazil) André Sá	6–2, 5–7, [10–4]
Loss	43–33	Jun 2016	Ilkley, Great Britain	Challenger	Grass	(Brazil) Marcelo Demoliner	(Netherlands) Wesley Koolhof (Netherlands) Matwé Middelkoop	6–7^{(5–7)}, 6–0, [8–10]
Win	44–33	Jun 2017	Surbiton, Great Britain	Challenger	Grass	(New Zealand) Marcus Daniell	(Philippines) Treat Huey (United States) Denis Kudla	6–3, 7–6^{(7–0)}
Loss	44–34	Apr 2019	Monterrey, Mexico	Challenger	Hard	(Mexico) Santiago González	(United States) Evan King (United States) Nathan Pasha	5–7, 2–6
Win	45–34	Jun 2019	Nottingham, Great Britain	Challenger	Grass	(Mexico) Santiago González	(China) Gong Maoxin (China) Zhang Ze	4–6, 7–6^{(7–5)}, [10–5]
Win	46–34	Jun 2019	Ilkley, Great Britain	Challenger	Grass	(Mexico) Santiago González	(New Zealand) Marcus Daniell (India) Leander Paes	6–3, 6–4
Loss	46–35	Oct 2021	Mouilleron-le-Captif, France	Challenger	Hard (i)	(Netherlands) David Pel	(France) Jonathan Eysseric (France) Quentin Halys	6–4, 6–7^{(5–7)}, [8–10]
Loss	46–36	Nov 2021	Pau, France	Challenger	Hard (i)	(Spain) David Vega Hernández	(Monaco) Romain Arneodo (Austria) Tristan-Samuel Weissborn	4-6, 2-6
Loss	46–37	May 2022	Surbiton, UK	Challenger	Grass	(Kazakhstan) Aleksandr Nedovyesov	(United Kingdom) Julian Cash (United Kingdom) Henry Patten	6–4, 3–6, [9–11]
Loss	46–38	Mar 2023	Lille, France	Challenger	Hard (i)	(Jamaica) Dustin Brown	(Australia) Max Purcell (Australia) Jason Taylor	6–7^{(3–7)}, 4-6
Win	47–38	Jul 2023	Iași, Romania	Challenger	Clay	(Colombia) Nicolás Barrientos	(Romania) Gabi Adrian Boitan (Romania) Bogdan Pavel	6–3, 6–3
Loss	47–39	Sep 2023	Istanbul, Turkey	Challenger	Hard	(Netherlands) Sander Arends	(United Kingdom) Luke Johnson (Tunisia) Skander Mansouri	6–7^{(3–7)}, 3–6
Loss	47–40	Nov 2025	Islamabad, Pakistan	Challenger	Hard	(Pakistan) Muzammil Murtaza	(Czech Republic) Dominik Palán (Kazakhstan) Denis Yevseyev	6–7^{(3–7)}, 4–6

== ATP Rankings ==
Singles

Year	1998	1999	2000	2001	2002	2003	2004	2005	2006	2007	2008	2009	2010
High	775T	309	238	243	224	341	181	212	392	125	125	276	630
Low	1077T	779T	332	332	345	495	353	484	484	425	300	680	1071T
Year End	779T	309	261	251	265	493	199	450	417	148	221	636	1071T

Doubles

Year	1998	1999	2000	2001	2002	2003	2004	2005	2006	2007	2008	2009	2010	2011	2012	2013	2014	2015	2016	2017	2018	2019	2020	2021	2022	2023	2024	2025
High	984T	355	185	164	93	89	127	127	173	90	52	59	16	8	9	8	15	34	37	23	29	47	49	48	42	64	126	701
Low	1005T	1001T	361	183	209	195	200	188	548	385	90	107	65	20	16	15T	35	57	53	40	57	67	56	58	65	126	694	1108
Year End	998T	355	211	170	107	172	134	181	380	90	89	59	18	9	14	15	34	37	40	31	47	52	50	50	64	126	694	1105

=== Weeks statistics ===
Weeks at	Total weeks	Consecutive
Top 10	43	17
Top 20	182	174
Top 30	249	213
Top 40	349	243
Top 50	493	264
Top 100	804	700

=== Weeks inside Top 10 ===
Week No.	Date	Rank	Change	Points	+/-
1.	May 16, 2011	10	▲2	4,080	Steady
2.	May 23, 2011	10	Steady	4,020	▼60
3.	May 23, 2011	10	Steady	4,020	Steady
4.	June 6, 2011	8	▲2	4,290	▲270
5.	June 13, 2011	8	Steady	4,450	▲160
6.	June 20, 2011	8	Steady	4,450	Steady
7.	June 20, 2011	8	Steady	4,450	Steady
8.	July 4, 2011	9	▼1	4,090	▼360
9.	July 11, 2011	9	Steady	4,090	Steady
10.	July 18, 2011	9	Steady	4,090	Steady
11.	July 25, 2011	9	Steady	4,090	Steady
12.	August 1, 2011	9	Steady	4,090	Steady
13.	August 8, 2011	10	▼1	4,000	▼90
14.	August 15, 2011	10	Steady	4,090	▲90
15.	August 22, 2011	10	Steady	4,180	▲90
16.	August 29, 2011	10	Steady	4,120	▼60
17.	August 29, 2011	10	Steady	4,120	Steady
18.	November 14, 2011	9	▲6	4,720	▲1000
19.	November 21, 2011	9	Steady	4,720	Steady
20.	November 28, 2011	9	Steady	4,720	Steady
21.	December 5, 2011	9	Steady	4,720	Steady
22.	December 12, 2011	9	Steady	4,720	Steady
23.	December 19, 2011	9	Steady	4,720	Steady
24.	December 26, 2011	9	Steady	4,720	Steady
Year End 2011		9	▲9	4,720	▲1452
25.	January 2, 2012	9	Steady	4,720	Steady
26.	January 9, 2012	9	Steady	4,720	Steady
27.	January 16, 2012	9	Steady	4,720	Steady
28.	January 16, 2012	9	Steady	4,720	Steady
29.	January 30, 2012	9	Steady	4,720	Steady
30.	February 6, 2012	9	Steady	4,720	Steady
31.	February 13, 2012	9	Steady	4,720	Steady
32.	February 20, 2012	10	▼1	4,720	Steady
33.	February 27, 2012	10	Steady	4,720	Steady
34.	April 1, 2013	9	▲5	5,040	▲910
35.	April 8, 2013	9	Steady	5,040	Steady
36.	April 15, 2013	9	Steady	5,040	Steady
37.	April 22, 2013	8	▲1	5,130	▲90
38.	April 29, 2013	8	Steady	5,130	Steady
39.	May 6, 2013	9	▼1	5,030	▼100
40.	May 13, 2013	9	Steady	4,850	▼180
41.	May 20, 2013	9	Steady	4,850	Steady
42.	May 27, 2013	9	Steady	4,850	Steady
43	May 27, 2013	9	Steady	4,850	Steady
Total number of weeks spent inside Top 10:– 43 Weeks

== Best Grand Slam results details ==
=== Men's doubles ===
Australian Open
2018 Australian Open (15th seed)
Partner: (Poland) Marcin Matkowski
Round	Opponents	Rank	Score
1R	(Brazil) Marcelo Demoliner (Philippines) Treat Huey	35; 63	7–6^{(8–6)}, 6–4
2R	(Sweden) Robert Lindstedt (Croatia) Franko Škugor	66; 41	7–6^{(7–4)}, 6–4
3R	(Moldova) Radu Albot (South Korea) Chung Hyeon	212; 396	Walkover
QF	(United States) Bob Bryan (6) (United States) Mike Bryan (6)	12; 12	1–6, 4–6

French Open
2012 French Open (10th Seed)
Partner: (Netherlands) Jean-Julien Rojer
Round	Opponents	Rank	Score
1R	(France) Jonathan Dasnières de Veigy (WC) (France) Nicolas Renavand (WC)	490; 139	6–3, 6–2
2R	(Germany) Björn Phau (Canada) Adil Shamasdin	181; 81	6–3, 3–6, 7–6^{(7–4)}
3R	(Philippines) Treat Conrad Huey (United Kingdom) Dominic Inglot	45; 125	6–1, 6–4
QF	(France) Michaël Llodra (3) (Serbia) Nenad Zimonjić (3)	5; 6	6–4, 2–1 ret.
SF	(United States) Bob Bryan (2) (United States) Mike Bryan (2)	3; 3	3–6, 6–7^{(6–8)}

Wimbledon Championships
2010 Wimbledon (unseeded)
Partner: (India) Rohan Bopanna
Round	Opponents	Rank	Score
1R	(India) Somdev Devvarman (Q) (Philippines) Treat Huey (Q)	224; 129	3–6, 7–5, 6–3, 7–6^{(8–6)}
2R	(Germany) Philipp Marx (Slovakia) Igor Zelenay	69; 62	6–7^{(6–8)}, 6–4, 6–4, 4–6, 13–11
3R	(Slovakia) Lukáš Lacko (Ukraine) Sergiy Stakhovsky	263; 110	7–5, 7–6^{(7–4)}, 6–2
QF	(Austria) Jürgen Melzer (Germany) Philipp Petzschner	26; 60	4–6, 6–7^{(3–7)}, 2–6

US Open
2010 US Open (16th seed)
Partner: (India) Rohan Bopanna
Round	Opponents	Rank	Score
1R	(United States) Brian Battistone (WC) (United States) Ryler DeHeart (WC)	106; 161	6–3, 7–6^{(9–7)}
2R	(Germany) Michael Kohlmann (Finland) Jarkko Nieminen	36; 35	6–4, 6–4
3R	(Canada) Daniel Nestor (2) (Serbia) Nenad Zimonjić (2)	3; 3	6–3, 6–4
QF	(South Africa) Wesley Moodie (10) (Belgium) Dick Norman (10)	22; 20	7–5, 7–6^{(7–2)}
SF	(Argentina) Eduardo Schwank (Argentina) Horacio Zeballos	54; 43	7–6^{(7–5)}, 6–4
F	(United States) Bob Bryan (1) (United States) Mike Bryan (1)	1; 1	6–7^{(5–7)}, 6–7^{(4–7)}

=== Mixed doubles ===
Australian Open
2012 Australian Open (7th seed)
Partner: (Czech Republic) Andrea Hlaváčková
Round	Opponents	Score
1R	(Australia) Jelena Dokic (WC) (Australia) Paul Hanley (WC)	6–3, 6–1
2R	(Serbia) Jelena Janković (WC) (Australia) Bernard Tomic (WC)	6–3, 6–3
QF	(Italy) Roberta Vinci (Alt) (Italy) Daniele Bracciali (Alt)	1–6, 5–7
2014 Australian Open (unseeded)
Partner: (Germany) Julia Görges
Round	Opponents	Score
1R	(Croatia) Donna Vekić (WC) (Australia) Thanasi Kokkinakis (WC)	6–3, 6–4
2R	(Czech Republic) Andrea Sestini Hlaváčková (4) (Belarus) Max Mirnyi (4)	6–3, 6–4
QF	(India) Sania Mirza (6) (Romania) Horia Tecău (6)	3–6, 4–6
2022 Australian Open (Alternate)
Partner: (Japan) Makoto Ninomiya
Round	Opponents	Score
1R	(United States) Jessica Pegula (United States) Austin Krajicek	6–4, 6–3
2R	(Ukraine) Lyudmyla Kichenok (Kazakhstan) Andrey Golubev	6–3, 6–4
QF	(Czech Republic) Lucie Hradecká (Ecuador) Gonzalo Escobar	5–7, 5–7

French Open
2013 French Open (unseeded)
Partner: (Zimbabwe) Cara Black
Round	Opponents	Score
1R	(India) Sania Mirza (1) (Sweden) Robert Lindstedt (1)	6–2, 6–3
2R	(Chinese Taipei) Hsieh Su-wei (Denmark) Frederik Nielsen	6–4, 6–0
QF	(Russia) Nadia Petrova (Colombia) Juan Sebastián Cabal	7–6^{(7–5)}, 6—3
SF	(France) Kristina Mladenovic (5) (Canada) Daniel Nestor (5)	5–7, 4–6
2019 French Open (Alternate)
Partner: (Ukraine) Nadiia Kichenok
Round	Opponents	Score
1R	(Japan) Makoto Ninomiya (New Zealand) Artem Sitak	3–6, 6–2, [10–4]
2R	(Croatia) Darija Jurak (United States) Austin Krajicek	6–4, 4–6, [10–7]
QF	(Chinese Taipei) Chan Hao-ching (5) (Austria) Oliver Marach (5)	6–3, 6–4
SF	(Canada) Gabriela Dabrowski (2) (Croatia) Mate Pavić (2)	7–6^{(7–4)}, 1–6, [8–10]

Wimbledon Championships
2014 Wimbledon (16th seed)
Partner: (Russia) Vera Dushevina
Round	Opponents	Score
1R	bye	
2R	(Austria) Oliver Marach (Czech Republic) Karolína Plíšková	3–6, 7–6^{(7–1)}, 6–3
3R	(United States) Bob Bryan (2) (Czech Republic) Květa Peschke (2)	7–5, 6–4
QF	(United Kingdom) Neal Skupski (WC) (United Kingdom) Naomi Broady (WC)	6–4, 6–3
SF	(Serbia) Nenad Zimonjić (15) (Australia) Samantha Stosur (15)	5–7, 2–6
2016 Wimbledon (14th seed)
Partner: (Kazakhstan) Yaroslava Shvedova
Round	Opponents	Score
1R	bye	
2R	(China) Zhang Shuai (Austria) Julian Knowle	6–3, 7–6^{(7–4)}
3R	(United Kingdom) Anna Smith (WC) (United Kingdom) Neal Skupski (WC)	6–3, 6–4
QF	(Slovenia) Katarina Srebotnik (11) (Poland) Marcin Matkowski (11)	6–3, 3–6, 7–5
SF	(Germany) Anna-Lena Grönefeld (15) (Colombia) Robert Farah (15)	4–6, 6–2, 5–7

US Open
2010 US Open (unseeded)
Partner: (Czech Republic) Květa Peschke
Round	Opponents	Score
1R	(United States) Vania King (8) (Romania) Horia Tecău (8)	7–5, 4–6, [10–5]
2R	(Kazakhstan) Yaroslava Shvedova (Austria) Julian Knowle	5–7, 6–3, [10–4]
QF	(Argentina) Gisela Dulko (Uruguay) Pablo Cuevas	3–6, 6–2, [10–4]
SF	(Germany) Anna-Lena Grönefeld (The Bahamas) Mark Knowles	7–6^{(7–5)}, 7–6^{(7–4)}
F	(United States) Liezel Huber (1) (United States) Bob Bryan (1)	6–4, 6–4

== Grand Slam seedings ==
The advances into finals by Qureshi are in italics.

=== Men's doubles ===
Not seeded at all, or not seeded inside the top 10 Seeded 10–4 Seeded no. 3 Seeded no. 2 Seeded no. 1

Year	Australian Open	French Open	Wimbledon	US Open
2002	did not play		not seeded	wild card
2003	did not play	not seeded	not seeded	did not play
2004	did not play			
2005	did not play			
2006	did not play			
2007	did not play			
2008	did not play	not seeded	not seeded	not seeded
2009	did not play		not seeded	not seeded
2010	not seeded	not seeded	not seeded	16th (1)
2011	10th	5th	4th	5th
2012	8th	10th	8th	9th
2013	6th	6th	8th	5th
2014	7th	6th	8th	13th
2015	8th	not seeded	not seeded	not seeded
2016	not seeded	14th	not seeded	not seeded
2017	not seeded	13th	14th	16th
2018	15th	7th	9th	not seeded
2019	not seeded	not seeded	not seeded	not seeded
2020	not seeded	not seeded	tournament cancelled	not seeded
2021	not seeded	not seeded	not seeded	not seeded
2022	not seeded	not seeded	not seeded	not seeded
2023	not seeded	did not play		
2024	did not play			
2025	did not play			

=== Mixed doubles ===
Not seeded at all, or not seeded inside the top 10 Seeded 10–4 Seeded no. 3 Seeded no. 2 Seeded no. 1

Year	Australian Open	French Open	Wimbledon	US Open
2010	did not play	not seeded	not seeded	not seeded (1)
2011	5th	3rd	5th	did not play
2012	7th	8th	7th	not seeded
2013	not seeded	not seeded	10th	not seeded
2014	not seeded	did not play	16th	not seeded
2015	not seeded	not seeded	not seeded	did not play
2016	not seeded	not seeded	14th	not seeded
2017	not seeded	not seeded	not seeded	not seeded
2018	not seeded	not seeded	not seeded	not seeded
2019	did not play	not seeded	not seeded	did not play
2020	did not play	tournament cancelled		
2021	did not play		not seeded	did not play
2022	not seeded	did not play		
2023	did not play			
2024	did not play			
2025	did not play			

== ATP Tour career earnings ==
Year	Earnings ($)	Money list rank
1998	1,552	—N/a
1999	14,998	414
2000	25,930	—N/a
2001	31,599	—N/a
2002	48,106	256
2003	25,535	342
2004	35,079	312
2005	20,246	389
2006	12,945	526
2007	118,382	173
2008	115,953	193
2009	71,731	249
2010	266,218	107
2011	434,430	72
2012	358,384	90
2013	385,479	89
2014	228,678	146
2015	178,738	166
2016	190,795	164
2017	318,009	127
2018	257,497	158
2019	155,927	219
2020	86,358	235
2021	154,732	236
2022	116,166	289
2023	62,192	403
2024	10,470	842
2025	190	3776
Career	3,732,239	326
