= 2025 Islamabad Challenger – Singles =

Singles
- 2025 Islamabad Challenger

Final
- Champion: (United Kingdom) Jay Clarke
- Runner-up: (Turkey) Mert Alkaya
- Score: 6–3, 6–1

Events
Singles	Doubles
Islamabad Challenger	· 2026 →

This was the first edition of the tournament.

Jay Clarke won the title after defeating Mert Alkaya 6–3, 6–1 in the final.

== Seeds ==
1. (Sweden) Elias Ymer (quarterfinals)
2. (United Kingdom) Jay Clarke (champion)
3. (Georgia (country)) Saba Purtseladze (first round, retired)
4. (Kazakhstan) Denis Yevseyev (semifinals)
5. (Ukraine) Vadym Ursu (quarterfinals)
6. (Turkey) Mert Alkaya (final)
7. (Sweden) Leo Borg (second round)
8. (Czech Republic) Dominik Palán (quarterfinals)

== Draw ==
Key

- Q = Qualifier
- WC = Wild card
- LL = Lucky loser
- Alt = Alternate
- ITF = ITF entry
- PR = Protected ranking
- SR = Special ranking
- SE = Special exempt
- JE = Junior exempt
- JR = Junior Accelerator Programme entrant
- CO = College Accelerator Programme entrant
- NG = Next Gen Accelerator Program entrant
- w/o = Walkover
- r = Retired
- d = Defaulted

=== Finals ===
Semifinals
6	(Turkey) Mert Alkaya	6^{7}	6	6
4	(Kazakhstan) Denis Yevseyev	7^{9}	1	3
(United Kingdom) Zach Stephens	5	3
2	(United Kingdom) Jay Clarke	7	6

Final
6	(Turkey) Mert Alkaya	3	1
2	(United Kingdom) Jay Clarke	6	6

=== Top half ===
First round
(United States) Preston Brown	6^{2}	4
(Romania) Dragoș Nicolae Cazacu	7^{7}	6
Alt	Alexey Aleshchev	1	3
(Switzerland) Gian Luca Tanner	6	6
Q	(Pakistan) Samir Iftikhar	2	2
6	(Turkey) Mert Alkaya	6	6
4	(Kazakhstan) D Yevseyev	7^{9}	6
Alt	Ivan Gretskiy	6^{7}	3
WC	(Pakistan) M Murtaza	6	3	6
Q	(Pakistan) Yousaf Khalil	3	6	2
Alt	(Australia) Adrian Arcon	1	1
(Switzerland) J Nikles	6	6
Alt	(Austria) Matthias Ujvary	2	4
7	(Sweden) L Borg	6	6

Second round
1	(Sweden) E Ymer	6	6
(Romania) DN Cazacu	3	1
(Switzerland) GL Tanner	7	3	4
6	(Turkey) M Alkaya	5	6	6
4	(Kazakhstan) D Yevseyev	6	6
WC	(Pakistan) M Murtaza	1	0
(Switzerland) J Nikles	6	2	7
7	(Sweden) L Borg	4	6	5

Quarterfinals
1	(Sweden) E Ymer	6^{8}	6	0
6	(Turkey) M Alkaya	7^{10}	4	6
4	(Kazakhstan) D Yevseyev	4	6	6
(Switzerland) J Nikles	6	1	3

Semifinals
6	(Turkey) M Alkaya	6^{7}	6	6
4	(Kazakhstan) D Yevseyev	7^{9}	1	3

=== Bottom half ===
First round
8	(Czech Republic) D Palán	6	6
(Turkey) Alp Horoz	3	4
Alt	(Italy) Leonardo Borrelli	7^{7}	6
Alt	(Australia) Lawrence Bataljin	6^{5}	1
(United Kingdom) Zach Stephens	6	6
Alt	(Turkey) Gökberk Sarıtaş	1	0
(Ukraine) Nikita Bilozertsev	6	3
3	(Georgia (country)) S Purtseladze	2	0^{r}
5	(Ukraine) Vadym Ursu	6	6^{9}	6
WC	(Pakistan) Muhammad Shoaib	3	7^{11}	3
Timofei Derepasko	6	6
Alt	(Turkey) K Kırcı	0	3
WC	(Pakistan) A Khan	6	6^{5}	1
Alt	(Bulgaria) Dinko Dinev	4	7^{7}	6

Second round
8	(Czech Republic) D Palán	7^{8}	6
Alt	(Italy) L Borrelli	6^{6}	4
(United Kingdom) Z Stephens	4	7^{7}	5
(Ukraine) N Bilozertsev	6	6^{2}	0^{r}
5	(Ukraine) V Ursu	6	6
T Derepasko	2	1
Alt	(Bulgaria) D Dinev	2	7^{7}	2
2	(United Kingdom) J Clarke	6	6^{1}	6

Quarterfinals
8	(Czech Republic) D Palán	5	3
(United Kingdom) Z Stephens	7	6
5	(Ukraine) V Ursu	3	6	6^{6}
2	(United Kingdom) J Clarke	6	4	7^{8}

Semifinals
(United Kingdom) Z Stephens	5	3
2	(United Kingdom) J Clarke	7	6
