= 2025 Islamabad Challenger – Doubles =

Doubles
- 2025 Islamabad Challenger

Final
- Champions: (Czech Republic) Dominik Palán (Kazakhstan) Denis Yevseyev
- Runners-up: (Pakistan) Muzammil Murtaza (Pakistan) Aisam-ul-Haq Qureshi
- Score: 7–6^{(7–3)}, 6–4

Events
Singles	Doubles
Islamabad Challenger	· 2026 →

This was the first edition of the tournament.

Dominik Palán and Denis Yevseyev won the title after defeating Muzammil Murtaza and Aisam-ul-Haq Qureshi 7–6^{(7–3)}, 6–4 in the final.

This tournament marked the final appearance of former world No. 8 Qureshi.

== Seeds ==
1. (Romania) Dragoș Nicolae Cazacu / (Turkey) Gökberk Sarıtaş (quarterfinals)
2. (Switzerland) Johan Nikles / (Ukraine) Vadym Ursu (quarterfinals)
3. (Turkey) Mert Alkaya / (Turkey) Alp Horoz (semifinals)
4. (Czech Republic) Dominik Palán / (Kazakhstan) Denis Yevseyev (champions)

== Draw ==
Key

- Q = Qualifier
- WC = Wild card
- LL = Lucky loser
- Alt = Alternate
- ITF = ITF entry
- PR = Protected ranking
- SR = Special ranking
- SE = Special exempt
- JE = Junior exempt
- JR = Junior Accelerator Programme entrant
- CO = College Accelerator Programme entrant
- NG = Next Gen Accelerator Program entrant
- w/o = Walkover
- r = Retired
- d = Defaulted

First round
WC	(Pakistan) Hamza Roman (Pakistan) Abubakar Talha	2	5
(Ukraine) Nikita Bilozertsev (United States) Preston Brown	6	7
4	(Czech Republic) D Palán (Kazakhstan) D Yevseyev	7	6
(Australia) Lawrence Bataljin (Italy) Leonardo Borrelli	5	3
(Bulgaria) Dinko Dinev (Austria) Matthias Ujvary	w/o
(Sweden) L Borg (Georgia (country)) S Purtseladze
(United Kingdom) Zach Stephens (Switzerland) Gian Luca Tanner	6	6
Alexey Aleshchev (Australia) Adrian Arcon	2	4
Timofei Derepasko; Ivan Gretskiy	7^{7}	5	[6]
WC	(Pakistan) M Murtaza (Pakistan) A-u-H Qureshi	6^{5}	7	[10]

Quarterfinals
1	(Romania) Dragoș Nicolae Cazacu (Turkey) Gökberk Sarıtaş	5	6	[11]
(Ukraine) N Bilozertsev (United States) P Brown	7	4	[13]
4	(Czech Republic) D Palán (Kazakhstan) D Yevseyev	6	6
(Bulgaria) D Dinev (Austria) M Ujvary	4	2
(United Kingdom) Z Stephens (Switzerland) GL Tanner	5	3
3	(Turkey) Mert Alkaya (Turkey) Alp Horoz	7	6
WC	(Pakistan) M Murtaza (Pakistan) A-u-H Qureshi	6	6^{5}	[10]
2	(Switzerland) J Nikles (Ukraine) Vadym Ursu	3	7^{7}	[7]

Semifinals
(Ukraine) N Bilozertsev (United States) P Brown	1	5
4	(Czech Republic) D Palán (Kazakhstan) D Yevseyev	6	7
3	(Turkey) M Alkaya (Turkey) A Horoz	1	4
WC	(Pakistan) M Murtaza (Pakistan) A-u-H Qureshi	6	6

Final
4	(Czech Republic) D Palán (Kazakhstan) D Yevseyev	7^{7}	6
WC	(Pakistan) M Murtaza (Pakistan) A-u-H Qureshi	6^{3}	4
