= 2025 Islamabad Challenger =

- Date: 24 – 30 November
- Edition: 1st
- Surface: Hard
- Location: Islamabad, Pakistan

Champions

Singles
- (United Kingdom) Jay Clarke

Doubles
- (Czech Republic) Dominik Palán / (Kazakhstan) Denis Yevseyev
- Islamabad Challenger

The 2025 Islamabad Challenger was a professional tennis tournament played on hardcourts. It was the first edition of the tournament which was part of the 2025 ATP Challenger Tour. It took place in Islamabad, Pakistan between 24 and 30 November 2025.

== Singles main-draw entrants ==
=== Seeds ===
Country	Player	Rank^{1}	Seed
SWE	Elias Ymer	169	1
GBR	Jay Clarke	213	2
GEO	Saba Purtseladze	290	3
KAZ	Denis Yevseyev	401	4
UKR	Vadym Ursu	452	5
TUR	Mert Alkaya	473	6
SWE	Leo Borg	549	7
CZE	Dominik Palán	558	8

- ^{1} Rankings are as of 17 November 2025.

=== Other entrants ===
The following players received wildcards into the singles main draw:

- (Pakistan) Aqeel Khan
- (Pakistan) Muzammil Murtaza
- (Pakistan) Muhammad Shoaib

The following players received entry into the singles main draw as alternates:

- Alexey Aleshchev
- (Australia) Adrian Arcon
- (Australia) Lawrence Bataljin
- (Italy) Leonardo Borrelli
- (Bulgaria) Dinko Dinev
- Ivan Gretskiy
- (Turkey) Koray Kırcı
- (Turkey) Gökberk Sarıtaş
- (Austria) Matthias Ujvary

The following players received entry from the qualifying draw:

- (Pakistan) Samir Iftikhar
- (Pakistan) Yousaf Khalil

== Champions ==
=== Singles ===
- (United Kingdom) Jay Clarke def. (Turkey) Mert Alkaya 6–3, 6–1.

=== Doubles ===
- (Czech Republic) Dominik Palán / (Kazakhstan) Denis Yevseyev def. (Pakistan) Muzammil Murtaza / (Pakistan) Aisam-ul-Haq Qureshi 7–6^{(7–3)}, 6–4.
