= 2025 Davis Cup World Group I play-offs =

Tennis tournament

The 2025 Davis Cup World Group I play-offs will be held from 31 January to 2 February 2025. The thirteen winners of this round will qualify for the 2025 Davis Cup World Group I while the thirteen losers will compete at the 2025 Davis Cup World Group II.

== Teams ==
Twenty-six teams will play for thirteen spots in the World Group I, in series decided on a home and away basis.

These twenty-six teams are:

- 12 losing teams from 2024 World Group I
- 12 winning teams from 2024 World Group II
- 2 highest-ranked losing teams from 2024 World Group II

The 13 winning teams from the play-offs will qualify for the World Group I and the 13 losing teams will play at the World Group II.

#: Nations Ranking as of 18 September 2024.

Seeded teams

1. Kazakhstan (#21)
2. Portugal (#26)
3. Bosnia and Herzegovina (#30)
4. Colombia (#32)
5. Turkey (#33)
6. Peru (#34)
7. Ukraine (#35)
8. Ecuador (#36)
9. Romania (#37)
10. India (#38)
11. Greece (#39)
12. Lithuania (#40)
13. Poland (#41)

Unseeded teams

- Uzbekistan (#42)
- Bulgaria (#43)
- Egypt (#44)
- Uruguay (#45)
- Lebanon (=#46)
- Mexico (=#46)
- Pakistan (=#46)
- Monaco (#51)
- Barbados (#53)
- Luxembourg (=#54)
- Tunisia (#56)
- Georgia (#61)
- Togo (#73)

== Results summary ==
| Home team | Score | Away team | Location | Venue | Surface |
|---|---|---|---|---|---|
| Kazakhstan [1] | 4–0 | Pakistan | Astana | Beeline Arena | Hard (i) |
| Monaco | 2–3 | Portugal [2] | Roquebrune-Cap-Martin (France) | Monte Carlo Country Club | Clay |
| Uzbekistan | 1–3 | Bosnia and Herzegovina [3] | Tashkent | Olympic Tennis School | Hard (i) |
| Colombia [4] | 3–2 | Barbados | Ibagué | Complejo de Raqueta | Clay |
| Turkey [5] | 5–0 | Mexico | Istanbul | Tenis Eskrim Dağcılık SK | Hard (i) |
| Lebanon | 0–4 | Peru [6] | Cairo (Egypt) | Smash Sporting Club | Clay |
| Tunisia | 3–2 | Ukraine [7] | El Menzah | El Menzah Sports Palace | Hard (i) |
| Ecuador [8] | 3–1 | Uruguay | Salinas | Salinas Golf y Tenis Club | Hard |
| Romania [9] | 1–3 | Bulgaria | Craiova | Polyvalent Hall | Hard (i) |
| India [10] | 4–0 | Togo | New Delhi | DLTA Complex | Hard |
| Greece [11] | 3–2 | Egypt | Athens | Ace Tennis Club | Clay (i) |
| Luxembourg | 3–1 | Lithuania [12] | Luxembourg City | d'Coque | Hard (i) |
| Georgia | 0–4 | Poland [13] | Tbilisi | Tbilisi Sports Palace | Hard (i) |

== Results ==
=== Kazakhstan vs. Pakistan ===
Kazakhstan
4
National Tennis Centre, Astana, Kazakhstan
1–2 February 2025
Hard (i)

Pakistan
0

| | | | 1 | 2 | 3 |
|---|---|---|---|---|---|---|
| 1 | (Kazakhstan) (Pakistan) | Alexander Shevchenko; Muzammil Murtaza | 6; 2 | 6; 1 |
| 2 | (Kazakhstan) (Pakistan) | Beibit Zhukayev; Huzaifa Abdul Rehman | 7; 5 | 6; 0 |
| 3 | (Kazakhstan) (Pakistan) | Alexander Shevchenko / Timofei Skatov; Muzammil Murtaza / Aqeel Khan | 6; 4 | 7^{7} 6^{1} |
| 4 | (Kazakhstan) (Pakistan) | Denis Yevseyev; Ahmad Nael Quereshi | 6; 0 | 6; 0 |
| 5 | (Kazakhstan) (Pakistan) | Beibit Zhukayev; Muzammil Murtaza | | | | not played |

=== Monaco vs. Portugal ===
Monaco
2
Monte Carlo Country Club, Roquebrune-Cap-Martin, France
1–2 February 2025
Clay

Portugal
3

| | | | 1 | 2 | 3 |
|---|---|---|---|---|---|
| 1 | (Monaco) (Portugal) | Valentin Vacherot; Jaime Faria | 6; 4 | 6^{5} 7^{7} | 6; 2 |
| 2 | (Monaco) (Portugal) | Benjamin Balleret; Nuno Borges | 3; 6 | 1; 6 |
| 3 | (Monaco) (Portugal) | Romain Arneodo / Hugo Nys; Nuno Borges / Francisco Cabral | 3; 6 | 6; 3 | 5; 7 |
| 4 | (Monaco) (Portugal) | Valentin Vacherot; Nuno Borges | 4; 6 | 6; 1 | 6; 2 |
| 5 | (Monaco) (Portugal) | Romain Arneodo; Henrique Rocha | 5; 7 | 5; 7 |

=== Uzbekistan vs. Bosnia and Herzegovina ===
Uzbekistan
1
Olympic Tennis School, Tashkent, Uzbekistan
31 January–1 February 2025
Hard (i)

Bosnia and Herzegovina
3

| | | | 1 | 2 | 3 |
|---|---|---|---|---|---|---|
| 1 | (Uzbekistan) (Bosnia and Herzegovina) | Khumoyun Sultanov; Mirza Bašić | 6; 4 | 3; 6 | 7^{7} 6^{4} |
| 2 | (Uzbekistan) (Bosnia and Herzegovina) | Sergey Fomin; Damir Džumhur | 6^{7} 7^{9} | 3; 6 |
| 3 | (Uzbekistan) (Bosnia and Herzegovina) | Sergey Fomin / Khumoyun Sultanov; Mirza Bašić / Nerman Fatić | 6^{6} 7^{8} | 6^{2} 7^{7} |
| 4 | (Uzbekistan) (Bosnia and Herzegovina) | Khumoyun Sultanov; Damir Džumhur | 4; 6 | 6; 1 | 3; 6 |
| 5 | (Uzbekistan) (Bosnia and Herzegovina) | Sergey Fomin; Mirza Bašić | | | | not played |

=== Colombia vs. Barbados ===
Colombia
3
Complejo de Raqueta, Ibagué, Colombia
31 January–1 February 2025
Clay

Barbados
2

| | | | 1 | 2 | 3 |
|---|---|---|---|---|---|
| 1 | (Colombia) (Barbados) | Nicolás Mejía; Xavier Lawrence | 6; 2 | 6; 0 |
| 2 | (Colombia) (Barbados) | Adrià Soriano Barrera; Darian King | 2; 6 | 4; 6 |
| 3 | (Colombia) (Barbados) | Nicolás Barrientos / Cristian Rodríguez; Darian King / Stephen Slocombe | 7^{7} 6^{4} | 6; 2 |
| 4 | (Colombia) (Barbados) | Nicolás Mejía; Darian King | 3; 6 | 4; 6 |
| 5 | (Colombia) (Barbados) | Adrià Soriano Barrera; Kaipo Marshall | 6; 2 | 6; 2 |

=== Turkey vs. Mexico ===
Turkey
5
Tenis Eskrim Dağcılık SK, Istanbul, Turkey
1–2 February 2025
Hard (i)

Mexico
0

| | | | 1 | 2 | 3 |
|---|---|---|---|---|---|
| 1 | (Turkey) (Mexico) | Ergi Kırkın; Alex Hernández | 7; 5 | 5; 7 | 7; 5 |
| 2 | (Turkey) (Mexico) | Yankı Erel; Rodrigo Pacheco Méndez | 6; 4 | 1; 6 | 6; 1 |
| 3 | (Turkey) (Mexico) | Yankı Erel / Ergi Kırkın; Daniel Moreno / Rodrigo Pacheco Méndez | 2; 6 | 7; 5 | 6; 3 |
| 4 | (Turkey) (Mexico) | Atakan Karahan; Rafael Alonso de Alba Valdés | 6; 3 | 6; 3 |
| 5 | (Turkey) (Mexico) | Mert Naci Türker; Eugenio González Fitzmaurice | 6; 1 | 6; 2 |

=== Lebanon vs. Peru ===
Lebanon
0
Smash Sporting Club, Cairo, Egypt
31 January–1 February 2025
Clay

Peru
4

| | | | 1 | 2 | 3 |
|---|---|---|---|---|---|---|
| 1 | (Lebanon) (Peru) | Benjamin Hassan; Ignacio Buse | 3; 6 | 2; 6 |
| 2 | (Lebanon) (Peru) | Hady Habib; Gonzalo Bueno | 3; 6 | 6; 2 | 4; 6 |
| 3 | (Lebanon) (Peru) | Hady Habib / Benjamin Hassan; Conner Huertas del Pino / Ignacio Buse | 4; 6 | 5; 7 |
| 4 | (Lebanon) (Peru) | Fadi Bidan; Conner Huertas del Pino | 6^{4} 7^{7} | 6^{3} 7^{7} |
| 5 | (Lebanon) (Peru) | Benjamin Hassan; Gonzalo Bueno | | | | not played |

=== Tunisia vs. Ukraine ===
Tunisia
3
El Menzah Sports Palace, El Menzah, Tunisia
31 January–2 February 2025
Hard (i)

Ukraine
2

| | | | 1 | 2 | 3 |
|---|---|---|---|---|---|
| 1 | (Tunisia) (Ukraine) | Aziz Dougaz; Vitaliy Sachko | 3; 6 | 7^{8} 6^{6} | 3; 6 |
| 2 | (Tunisia) (Ukraine) | Moez Echargui; Oleksandr Ovcharenko | 7^{7} 6^{1} | 6; 2 |
| 3 | (Tunisia) (Ukraine) | Aziz Dougaz / Aziz Ouakaa; Oleksii Krutykh / Vitaliy Sachko | 6; 3 | 6; 4 |
| 4 | (Tunisia) (Ukraine) | Aziz Dougaz; Oleksandr Ovcharenko | 2; 6 | 2; 6 |
| 5 | (Tunisia) (Ukraine) | Moez Echargui; Vitaliy Sachko | 7; 5 | 6; 1 |

=== Ecuador vs. Uruguay ===
Ecuador
3
Salinas Golf y Tenis Club, Salinas, Ecuador
1–2 February 2025
Hard

Uruguay
1

| | | | 1 | 2 | 3 |
|---|---|---|---|---|---|---|
| 1 | (Ecuador) (Uruguay) | Andrés Andrade; Francisco Llanes | 6; 4 | 6; 0 |
| 2 | (Ecuador) (Uruguay) | Álvaro Guillén Meza; Franco Roncadelli | 6^{6} 7^{8} | 0; 6 |
| 3 | (Ecuador) (Uruguay) | Andrés Andrade / Diego Hidalgo; Ariel Behar / Ignacio Carou | 6; 3 | 7; 5 |
| 4 | (Ecuador) (Uruguay) | Andrés Andrade; Franco Roncadelli | 6; 4 | 6; 1 |
| 5 | (Ecuador) (Uruguay) | Álvaro Guillén Meza; Francisco Llanes | | | | not played |

=== Romania vs. Bulgaria ===
Romania
1
Polyvalent Hall, Craiova, Romania
31 January–1 February 2025
Hard (i)

Bulgaria
3

| | | | 1 | 2 | 3 |
|---|---|---|---|---|---|---|
| 1 | (Romania) (Bulgaria) | Cezar Crețu; Petr Nesterov | 6^{6} 7^{8} | 6; 3 | 7^{7} 6^{3} |
| 2 | (Romania) (Bulgaria) | Filip Cristian Jianu; Iliyan Radulov | 3; 6 | 6^{3} 7^{7} |
| 3 | (Romania) (Bulgaria) | Gabi Adrian Boitan / Victor Vlad Cornea; Alexander Donski / Petr Nesterov | 3; 6 | 3; 6 |
| 4 | (Romania) (Bulgaria) | Filip Cristian Jianu; Adrian Andreev | 3; 6 | 6; 3 | 3; 6 |
| 5 | (Romania) (Bulgaria) | Cezar Crețu; Iliyan Radulov | | | | not played |

=== India vs. Togo ===
India
4
DLTA Complex, New Delhi, India
1–2 February 2025
Hard

Togo
0

| | | | 1 | 2 | 3 |
|---|---|---|---|---|---|---|
| 1 | (India) (Togo) | Sasikumar Mukund; Liova Ajavon | 6; 2 | 6; 1 |
| 2 | (India) (Togo) | Ramkumar Ramanathan; Thomas Setodji | 6; 0 | 6; 2 |
| 3 | (India) (Togo) | Sriram Balaji / Rithvik Choudary Bollipalli; M'lapa Tingou Akomlo / Hod'abalo Padio | 6; 2 | 6; 1 |
| 4 | (India) (Togo) | Karan Singh; Hod'abalo Padio | 6; 2 | 6; 3 |
| 5 | (India) (Togo) | Ramkumar Ramanathan; Liova Ajavon | | | | not played |

=== Greece vs. Egypt ===
Greece
3
Ace Tennis Club, Pallini, Greece
1–2 February 2025
Clay (i)

Egypt
2

| | | | 1 | 2 | 3 |
|---|---|---|---|---|---|
| 1 | (Greece) (Egypt) | Christos Antonopoulos; Mohamed Safwat | 2; 6 | 2; 6 |
| 2 | (Greece) (Egypt) | Stefanos Sakellaridis; Karim-Mohamed Maamoun | 6; 1 | 6; 2 |
| 3 | (Greece) (Egypt) | Aristotelis Thanos / Petros Tsitsipas; Mohamed Safwat / Fares Zakaria | 6^{5} 7^{7} | 6^{6} 7^{8} |
| 4 | (Greece) (Egypt) | Stefanos Sakellaridis; Mohamed Safwat | 6; 4 | 3; 6 | 6; 2 |
| 5 | (Greece) (Egypt) | Aristotelis Thanos; Amr Elsayed | 6; 0 | 6; 3 |

=== Luxembourg vs. Lithuania ===
Luxembourg
3
d'Coque, Luxembourg City, Luxembourg
1–2 February 2025
Hard (i)

Lithuania
1

| | | | 1 | 2 | 3 |
|---|---|---|---|---|---|---|
| 1 | (Luxembourg) (Lithuania) | Chris Rodesch; Edas Butvilas | 3; 6 | 1; 6 |
| 2 | (Luxembourg) (Lithuania) | Alex Knaff; Vilius Gaubas | 6; 4 | 3; 6 | 6; 2 |
| 3 | (Luxembourg) (Lithuania) | Alex Knaff / Chris Rodesch; Edas Butvilas / Vilius Gaubas | 6; 2 | 7^{7} 6^{3} |
| 4 | (Luxembourg) (Lithuania) | Chris Rodesch; Vilius Gaubas | 6; 4 | 6; 4 |
| 5 | (Luxembourg) (Lithuania) | Alex Knaff; Edas Butvilas | | | | not played |

=== Georgia vs. Poland ===
Georgia
0
Tbilisi Sports Palace, Tbilisi, Georgia
31 January–1 February 2025
Hard (i)

Poland
4

| | | | 1 | 2 | 3 |
|---|---|---|---|---|---|---|
| 1 | (Georgia (country)) (Poland) | Aleksandre Bakshi; Kamil Majchrzak | 3; 6 | 6^{4} 7^{7} |
| 2 | (Georgia (country)) (Poland) | Saba Purtseladze; Maks Kaśnikowski | 3; 6 | 7; 5 | 4; 6 |
| 3 | (Georgia (country)) (Poland) | Aleksandre Bakshi / Zura Tkemaladze; Karol Drzewiecki / Jan Zieliński | 5; 7 | 1; 6 |
| 4 | (Georgia (country)) (Poland) | Zura Tkemaladze; Martyn Pawelski | 7; 5 | 6^{5} 7^{7} | 8; 10 |
| 5 | (Georgia (country)) (Poland) | Aleksandre Bakshi; Maks Kaśnikowski | | | | not played |
