= Jay Clarke (tennis) =

British tennis player (born 1998)

- Clarke at the 2026 Wimbledon Championships
- Full name: Jay Alexander Clarke
- Country (sports): Great Britain
- Residence: Derby, United Kingdom
- Born: 27 July 1998 (age 28) Derby, United Kingdom
- Height: 1.83 m (6 ft 0 in)
- Turned pro: 2016
- Plays: Right-handed (two-handed backhand)
- Coach: Yasmin Clarke, Ariana Saki
- Prize money: US $1,318,005

Singles
- Career record: 2–12 (at ATP Tour level, Grand Slam level, and in Davis Cup)
- Career titles: 0
- Highest ranking: No. 153 (22 July 2019)
- Current ranking: No. 240 (5 October 2026)

Grand Slam singles results
- Australian Open: Q1 (2019, 2020, 2021, 2026)
- French Open: Q2 (2018, 2026)
- Wimbledon: 2R (2019)
- US Open: Q2 (2025)

Doubles
- Career record: 2–6
- Career titles: 0
- Highest ranking: No. 221 (16 April 2018)
- Current ranking: No. 297 (5 October 2026)

Grand Slam doubles results
- Wimbledon: 3R (2017)

Grand Slam mixed doubles results
- Wimbledon: SF (2018)
- Last updated on: 15 October 2026.

Jay Alexander Clarke (born 27 July 1998) is a British tennis player, who competes on the ATP Challenger Tour. He has a career-high singles ranking of world No. 153 achieved on 22 July 2019 and a doubles ranking of No. 221 achieved on 16 April 2018. Clarke has won 5 Challenger and 12 Futures titles.

== Early and personal life ==
Clarke is from Pear Tree, Derby. He is of Jamaican-British descent. Clarke grew up in a tennis-orientated family with his two sisters and brother also playing tennis. He attributes his love of tennis to his father Earol who also coached him and his siblings. Clarke’s older sister Yasmin (former 532 WTA) is a big part of his team.

== Junior career ==
=== 2012 ===
Playing in the Great Britain Under 14 boys team, with Samuel Ferguson, they won the European Winter Cup defeating Sweden in the final.

Clarke won two Tennis Europe 14U Grade 1 events to become the 14U No.1 in Europe. Consequently, Clarke gained the May AEGON Junior Player of the Month Award.

=== 2015 ===
Clarke was the No. 1 ranked British junior, living and training in Stockholm.

== Professional career ==
=== 2016 ===
Clarke has risen from an ATP singles ranking of No. 1,621 in the world in June 2016 to a career high of No. 219 achieved on 4 December 2017. He trained with Andy Murray before the French Open and travelled with the Great Britain Davis Cup team for their tie against France.

=== 2017 ===
Clarke received a singles wildcard for the 2017 Wimbledon qualifiers but lost in the final round. Clarke was awarded a wildcard to the doubles main draw with Marcus Willis, where they reached the third round after upsetting the defending champions and second seeds Nicolas Mahut and Pierre-Hugues Herbert in a five-setter.

=== 2018 ===
Clarke made his ATP main draw debut at the Queen's Club Championships where he was given a wildcard into the singles event, he lost in straight sets to the American fifth seed Sam Querrey. Clarke was awarded a wildcard to the main draw of the 2018 Wimbledon Championship for his grand slam singles debut. Clarke reached the semifinals in the mixed doubles with Harriet Dart beating the first seeds in the third round.

=== 2025 ===
Jay Clarke won his first title in three years and fourth Challenger title overall at the 2025 Macedonian Open.

In November, he won the inaugural 2025 Islamabad Challenger.

== Performance timeline ==
Key
W	F	SF	QF	#R	RR	Q#	DNQ	A	NH

(W) winner; (F) finalist; (SF) semifinalist; (QF) quarterfinalist; (#R) rounds 4, 3, 2, 1; (RR) round-robin stage; (Q#) qualification round; (DNQ) did not qualify; (A) absent; (NH) not held; (SR) strike rate (events won / competed); (W–L) win–loss record.
To avoid confusion and double counting, these charts are updated at the conclusion of a tournament or when the player's participation has ended.

=== Singles ===
Tournament	2017	2018	2019	2020	2021	2022	2023	2024	2025	2026	SR	W–L	Win %
Grand Slam tournaments
Australian Open	A	A	Q1	Q1	Q1	A	A	A	A	Q1	0 / 0	0–0	–
French Open	A	Q2	Q1	Q1	Q1	Q1	A	A	A		0 / 0	0–0	–
Wimbledon	Q3	1R	2R	NH	1R	1R	A	Q2	1R		0 / 5	1–5	17%
US Open	A	Q1	Q1	A	A	Q1	A	A	Q2		0 / 0	0–0	–
Win–loss	0–0	0–1	1–1	0–0	0–1	0–1	0–0	0–0	0–1	0–0	0 / 5	1–5	17%
ATP Masters 1000
Miami Open	A	A	Q2	NH	A	Q1	A	A	A		0 / 0	0–0	–
Win–loss	0–0	0–0	0–0	0–0	0–0	0–0	0–0	0–0	0–0	0–0	0 / 0	0–0	–

== ATP Challengers and ITF Futures finals ==
=== Singles: 31 (17 titles, 14 runner-ups) ===
Legend ATP Challenger (5–6) ITF Futures/World Tennis Tour (12–8)	Finals by surface Hard (6–9) Clay (11–5)

Result	W–L	Date	Tournament	Tier	Surface	Opponent	Score
Loss	0–1	Nov 2017	Bangalore, India	Challenger	Hard	(India) Sumit Nagal	3–6, 6–3, 2–6
Win	1–1	Jul 2018	Binghamton, United States	Challenger	Hard	(Australia) Jordan Thompson	6–7^{(6–8)}, 7–6^{(7–5)}, 6–4
Win	2–1	Apr 2019	Anning, China	Challenger	Clay	(India) Prajnesh Gunneswaran	6–4, 6–3
Loss	2–2	Nov 2019	Pune, India	Challenger	Hard	(Australia) James Duckworth	6–4, 4–6, 4–6
Loss	2–3	Jul 2021	Nur-Sultan, Kazakhstan	Challenger	Hard	(Australia) Max Purcell	6–3, 4–6, 6–7^{(6–8)}
Loss	2–4	Jan 2022	Forlì, Italy	Challenger	Hard (i)	(United Kingdom) Jack Draper	3–6, 0–6
Win	3–4	May 2022	Cuernavaca, Mexico	Challenger	Hard	(Spain) Adrián Menéndez Maceiras	6–1, 4–6, 7–6^{(7–5)}
Win	4–4	May 2025	Skopje, North Macedonia	Challenger	Clay	(Bosnia and Herzegovina) Nerman Fatić	6–2, 6–3
Loss	4–5	Sep 2025	Târgu Mureș, Romania	Challenger	Clay	(Italy) Franco Agamenone	3–6, 4–6
Loss	4–6	Nov 2025	Soma Bay, Egypt	Challenger	Hard	(United Kingdom) Toby Samuel	6–4, 6–7^{(4–7)}, 0–6
Win	5–6	Nov 2025	Islamabad Challenger, Pakistan	Challenger	Hard	(Turkey) Mert Alkaya	6–3, 6–1
Win	1–0	Dec 2016	Egypt F35, Cairo	Futures	Clay	(Chile) Laslo Urrutia Fuentes	6–7^{(6–8)}, 6–3, 6–1
Win	2–0	Dec 2016	Egypt F36, Cairo	Futures	Clay	(Egypt) Youssef Hossam	6–4, 6–4
Win	3–0	Mar 2017	Turkey F9, Antalya	Futures	Clay	(France) Alexis Musialek	6–2, 6–4
Loss	3–1	Sep 2017	Italy F29, Santa Margherita di Pula	Futures	Clay	(Italy) Federico Gaio	2–6, 5–7
Loss	3–2	Mar 2018	Qatar F2, Doha	Futures	Hard	(Germany) Benjamin Hassan	6–3, 6–7^{(1–7)}, 4–6
Win	4–2	Mar 2018	Qatar F3, Doha	Futures	Hard	(Italy) Pietro Rondoni	6–1, 7–5
Win	5–2	May 2023	M25 Reggio Emilia, Italy	World Tour	Clay	(Italy) Julian Ocleppo	6–3, 6–4
Win	6–2	Nov 2023	M25 Antalya, Turkey	World Tour	Clay	(Bosnia and Herzegovina) Nerman Fatic	6–4, 7–5
Loss	6–3	Feb 2024	M25 Hammamet, Tunisia	World Tour	Clay	(Poland) Kamil Majchrzak	3–6, 5–7
Win	7–3	Feb 2024	M25 Hammamet, Tunisia	World Tour	Clay	(Austria) Sandro Kopp	4–6, 6–2, 6–3
Loss	7–4	Mar 2024	M15 Rovinj, Croatia	World Tour	Clay	(Croatia) Matej Dodig	6–7, 4–6
Win	8–4	May 2024	M25 Santa Margherita di Pula, Italy	World Tour	Clay	(Spain) Carlos Sánchez Jover	7–6^{(7–4)}, 3–6, 6–4
Loss	8–5	Jun 2024	M25 Kiseljak, Bosnia and Herzegovina	World Tour	Clay	(Poland) Maks Kaśnikowski	2–6, 2–6
Loss	8–6	Sep 2024	M25 Bali, Indonesia	World Tour	Hard	(Australia) Omar Jasika	4–6, 1–6
Win	9–6	Oct 2024	M25 Santa Margherita di Pula, Italy	World Tour	Clay	(Italy) Gianluca Mager	6–3 ret.
Win	10–6	Mar 2025	M15 Chandigarh, India	World Tour	Hard	(South Korea) Woobin Shin	7–6^{(7–5)}, 4–6, 6–0
Win	11–6	Mar 2025	M15 Ahmedabad, India	World Tour	Hard	(Italy) Alexandr Binda	6–3, 7–6^{(7–4)}
Loss	11–7	Mar 2025	M25 Ahmedabad, India	World Tour	Hard	(India) Aryan Shah	1–6, 3–6
Loss	11–8	Apr 2025	M25 Bengaluru, India	World Tour	Hard	(United Kingdom) Oliver Crawford	2–5 ret.
Win	12–8	Apr 2025	M25 Santa Margherita di Pula, Italy	World Tour	Clay	(France) Arthur Gea	4–6, 6–3, 6–4

=== Doubles: 16 (11 titles, 5 runner-ups) ===
Legend ATP Challenger (3–3) ITF Futures (8–2)	Finals by surface Hard (3–2) Clay (8–3) Grass (0–0)

Result	W–L	Date	Tournament	Tier	Surface	Partner	Opponents	Score
Loss	0–1	Dec 2016	Egypt F35, Cairo	Futures	Clay	(United Kingdom) Curtis Clarke	(India) Chandril Sood (India) Lakshit Sood	3–6, 2–6
Loss	0–1	Apr 2018	San Luis Potosí, Mexico	Challenger	Clay	(Germany) Kevin Krawietz	(El Salvador) Marcelo Arévalo (Mexico) Miguel Ángel Reyes-Varela	1–6, 4–6
Win	1–1	Feb 2023	Chennai, India	Challenger	Hard	(India) Arjun Kadhe	(Austria) Sebastian Ofner (Croatia) Nino Serdarušić	6–0, 6–4
Win	1–1	Oct 2023	M15 Sharm El Sheikh, Egypt	World Tennis Tour	Hard	(Ukraine) Volodoymyr Uzhylovkyi	(Czech Republic) Jiri Barnat (Czech Republic) Jan Hrazdil	7–5, 7–5
Win	2–1	Nov 2023	M25 Antalya, Turkey	World Tennis Tour	Clay	(Croatia) Josip Simundza	(Turkey) Cengiz Aksu (Turkey) Mert Naci Türker	1–6, 7–6^{(10–8)}, [10–8]
Win	3–1	Dec 2023	M15 Antalya, Turkey	World Tennis Tour	Clay	(United Kingdom) James MacKinlay	(Turkey) Sarp Ağabigün (France) Corentin Denolly	7–6^{(7–5)}, 7–5
Win	4–1	Dec 2023	M15 Antalya, Turkey	World Tennis Tour	Clay	(United Kingdom) James MacKinlay	Bogdan Bobrov (Bulgaria) Petr Nesterov	6–1, 6–2
Win	2–1	Jan 2024	Oeiras, Portugal	Challenger	Hard (i)	(United Kingdom) Marcus Willis	(France) Théo Arribagé (Belgium) Michael Geerts	6–4, 6–7^{(9–11)}, [10–3]
Loss	4–2	Jan 2024	M25 Loughborough, Great Britain	World Tennis Tour	Hard	(United Kingdom) Millen Hurrion	(United Kingdom) Charles Broom (United Kingdom) George Houghton	5–7, 3–6
Win	5–2	Feb 2024	M25 Hammamet, Tunisia	World Tennis Tour	Clay	(Austria) Sandro Kopp	(France) Corentin Denolly (Switzerland) Damien Wenger	6–2, 7–5
Win	6–2	Mar 2024	M25 Badalona, Spain	World Tennis Tour	Clay	(Italy) Augusto Virgili	(Netherlands) Ryan Nijboer (Spain) Alejo Sánchez Quílez	6–3, 4–6, [11–9]
Win	7–2	Apr 2024	M25 Hammamet, Tunisia	World Tennis Tour	Clay	(France) Constantin Bittoun Kouzmine	Aleksandr Lobanov (Tunisia) Aziz Ouakaa	6–3, 6–4
Win	8–2	May 2024	M25 Reggio Emilia, Italy	World Tennis Tour	Clay	(Germany) Kai Wehnelt	(Italy) Andrea Arnaboldi (Italy) Federico Arnaboldi	5–7, 6–2, [10–8]
Loss	2–2	Jul 2024	Amersfoort, Netherlands	Challenger	Clay	(United Kingdom) David Stevenson	(Brazil) Marcelo Demoliner (Argentina) Guillermo Durán	6–7^{(2–7)}, 4–6
Loss	2–3	Feb 2026	Chennai, India	Challenger	Hard	(India) Mukund Sasikumar	(Thailand) Pruchya Isaro (India) Niki Kaliyanda Poonacha	4–6, 4–6
Win	3–3	Mar 2026	Kigali, Rwanda	Challenger	Clay	(Netherlands) Max Houkes	(India) Siddhant Banthia (Bulgaria) Alexander Donski	6–4, 6–7^{(6–8)}, [12–10]
