= Park Minjong =

South Korean tennis player

- Country (sports): South Korea
- Born: 22 October 2001 (age 24)
- Plays: Right-handed (two-handed backhand)
- Prize money: $1,734

Singles
- Career record: 0–1
- Career titles: 0; 0 Challenger, 0 Futures
- Highest ranking: No. 1,348 (17 September 2018)
- Current ranking: No. 1,528 (1 February 2021)

Doubles
- Career record: 0–0
- Career titles: 0

Team competitions
- Davis Cup: 0–1
- Last updated on: 20 January 2020.

Park Minjong (born 22 October 2001) is a South Korean junior tennis player.

Park has a career-high ATP singles ranking of 1,348, achieved on 17 September 2018.

On the junior tour Park has a career-high ranking of 93 achieved on 31 December 2018.

Park has represented South Korea at Davis Cup, where he has a win-loss record of 0-1. He played first match when he was 16 years and 104 days old, against Pakistan.

== Davis Cup ==
=== Participations: (0–1) ===
Group membership World Group (0–0) Qualifying Round (0–0) WG Play-off (0–0) Group I (0–1) Group II (0–0) Group III (0–0) Group IV (0–0)	Matches by surface Hard (0–0) Clay (0–0) Grass (0–1) Carpet (0–0)	Matches by type Singles (0–1) Doubles (0–0)

- ▲ ▼ indicates the outcome of the Davis Cup match followed by the score, date, place of event, the zonal classification and its phase, and the court surface.

Rubber outcome	No.	Rubber	Match type (partner if any)	Opponent nation	Opponent player(s)	Score
▼0–4; 2–3 February 2018; Naval Sports Complex, Islamabad, Pakistan; Asia/Oceania Zone Group I First round; Grass surface
Defeat	1	IV	Singles (dead rubber)	Pakistan	Mohammad Abid Ali Khan Akbar	6–7^{(2–7)}, 6–7^{(5–7)}
