= 2025 Davis Cup World Group II =

Tennis competition

The 2025 Davis Cup World Group II will be held from 12 to 14 September 2025. The thirteen winners of this round will qualify for the 2026 Davis Cup World Group I play-offs while the thirteen losers will play at the 2026 Davis Cup World Group II play-offs.

== Teams ==
Twenty-six teams will participate in the World Group II, in series decided on a home and away basis.

These twenty-six teams are:

- 13 losing teams from the World Group I play-offs, held in January–February 2025
- 13 winning teams from the World Group II play-offs, held in January–February 2025

The 13 winning teams from the World Group II will play in the World Group I play-offs and the 13 losing teams will play in the World Group II play-offs in 2026.

#: Nations Ranking as of 3 February 2025.

Seeded teams

1. Ukraine (#40)
2. Romania (#42)
3. Lithuania (#43)
4. Egypt (#44)
5. Uzbekistan (#45)
6. Ireland (#46)
7. Monaco (#48=)
8. New Zealand (#48=)
9. Uruguay (#50)
10. Morocco (#51)
11. Lebanon (#52)
12. Mexico (#53=)
13. Pakistan (#53=)

Unseeded teams

- Barbados (#55=)
- Hong Kong (#55=)
- Georgia (#57)
- South Africa (#58)
- El Salvador (#59)
- Estonia (#60)
- Togo (#61)
- China (#62)
- Slovenia (#63)
- Paraguay (#64)
- Cyprus (#65)
- Dominican Republic (#66)
- Benin (#68)

== Results summary ==
| Home team | Score | Away team | Location | Venue | Surface |
|---|---|---|---|---|---|
| Ukraine [1] | 4–0 | Dominican Republic | Antalya (Turkey) | Megasaray Club Belek | Clay |
| El Salvador | 1–3 | Romania [2] | Santa Tecla | Federación Salvadoreña de Tenis | Hard |
| Lithuania [3] | 4–0 | Benin | Vilnius | SEB Arena | Hard (i) |
| Togo | 1–3 | Egypt [4] | Lomé | Stade de Tennis FTT | Hard |
| Hong Kong | 3–1 | Uzbekistan [5] | Hong Kong | Victoria Park Tennis Stadium | Hard |
| Ireland [6] | 1–3 | China | Dublin | Sport Ireland National Indoor Arena | Hard (i) |
| Cyprus | 1–3 | Monaco [7] | Nicosia | National Tennis Centre | Hard |
| New Zealand [8] | 3–1 | Georgia | Palmerston North | Central Energy Trust Arena | Hard (i) |
| Slovenia | 4–0 | Uruguay [9] | Ljubljana | Tennis Academy Breskvar | Hard |
| South Africa | 1–4 | Morocco [10] | Pretoria | Groenkloof Tennis Club | Hard |
| Lebanon [11] | 4–0 | Barbados | Cairo (Egypt) | Palm Hill Sports Club | Clay |
| Paraguay | 3–1 | Pakistan [12] | Asunción | Club Internacional de Tenis | Clay |
| Estonia | 1–3 | Mexico [13] | Tallinn | Kalev Sports Hall | Hard (i) |

== Results ==
=== Ukraine vs. Dominican Republic ===
Ukraine
4
Megasaray Club Belek, Antalya, Turkey
12–13 September 2025
Clay

Dominican Republic
0

| | | | 1 | 2 | 3 |
|---|---|---|---|---|---|---|
| 1 | (Ukraine) (Dominican Republic) | Vladyslav Orlov; Roberto Cid Subervi | 6; 2 | 6; 1 |
| 2 | (Ukraine) (Dominican Republic) | Viacheslav Bielinskyi; Peter Bertran | 6; 4 | 4; 6 | 7^{7} 6^{3} |
| 3 | (Ukraine) (Dominican Republic) | Vladyslav Orlov / Oleksandr Ovcharenko; Roberto Cid Subervi / Peter Bertran | 7^{9} 6^{7} | 6; 2 |
| 4 | (Ukraine) (Dominican Republic) | Oleksii Krutykh; Enmanuel Muñoz | 6; 1 | 6; 4 |
| 5 | (Ukraine) (Dominican Republic) | Vladyslav Orlov; Peter Bertran | | | | not played |

=== El Salvador vs. Romania ===
El Salvador
1
Federación Salvadoreña de Tenis, Santa Tecla, El Salvador
13–14 September 2025
Hard

Romania
3

| | | | 1 | 2 | 3 |
|---|---|---|---|---|---|---|
| 1 | (El Salvador) (Romania) | Marcelo Arévalo; Radu David Țurcanu | 7^{7} 6^{3} | 3; 6 | 2; 6 |
| 2 | (El Salvador) (Romania) | César Cruz; Gabriel Ghetu | 1; 6 | 6; 2 | 2; 6 |
| 3 | (El Salvador) (Romania) | Marcelo Arévalo / César Cruz; Mircea-Alexandru Jecan / Bogdan Pavel | 6; 4 | 6; 4 |
| 4 | (El Salvador) (Romania) | César Cruz; Radu David Țurcanu | 6^{5} 7^{7} | 3; 6 |
| 5 | (El Salvador) (Romania) | Juan Carlos Fuentes Vásquez; Gabriel Ghetu | 4; 6 | 0; 3 | | not completed |

=== Lithuania vs. Benin ===
Lithuania
4
SEB Arena, Vilnius, Lithuania
13–14 September 2025
Hard (i)

Benin
0

| | | | 1 | 2 | 3 |
|---|---|---|---|---|---|---|
| 1 | (Lithuania) (Benin) | Vilius Gaubas; Alexis Klégou | 6; 3 | 7; 5 |
| 2 | (Lithuania) (Benin) | Edas Butvilas; Patrick Agbo-Panzo | 6; 1 | 6; 2 |
| 3 | (Lithuania) (Benin) | Edas Butvilas / Vilius Gaubas; Patrick Agbo-Panzo / Sodick Noudogbessi | 6; 0 | 6; 2 |
| 4 | (Lithuania) (Benin) | Pijus Vaitiekūnas; Patrick Agbo-Panzo | 6; 3 | 7; 5 |
| 5 | (Lithuania) (Benin) | Edas Butvilas; Alexis Klégou | | | | not played |

=== Togo vs. Egypt ===
Togo
1
Stade de tennis FTT, Lomé, Togo
13–14 September 2025
Hard

Egypt
3

| | | | 1 | 2 | 3 |
|---|---|---|---|---|---|---|
| 1 | (Togo) (Egypt) | Kodjo Charles Alipoe-Tchotchodji; Fares Zakaria | 2; 6 | 0; 6 |
| 2 | (Togo) (Egypt) | Hod'abalo Isak Padio; Michael Bassem Sobhy | 4; 6 | 2; 6 |
| 3 | (Togo) (Egypt) | Kodjo Charles Alipoe-Tchotchodji / Hod'abalo Isak Padio; Amr Elsayed / Mohamed Safwat | 3; 6 | 3; 6 |
| 4 | (Togo) (Egypt) | Hod'abalo Isak Padio; Akram El Sallaly | 6; 4 | 6; 2 |
| 5 | (Togo) (Egypt) | Kodjo Charles Alipoe-Tchotchodji; Michael Bassem Sobhy | | | | not played |

=== Hong Kong vs. Uzbekistan ===
Hong Kong
3
Victoria Park Tennis Stadium, Hong Kong
13–14 September 2025
Hard

Uzbekistan
1

| | | | 1 | 2 | 3 |
|---|---|---|---|---|---|---|
| 1 | (Hong Kong) (Uzbekistan) | Coleman Wong; Sergey Fomin | 6; 3 | 6; 2 |
| 2 | (Hong Kong) (Uzbekistan) | Wong Tsz-fu; Khumoyun Sultanov | 6^{4} 7^{7} | 3; 6 |
| 3 | (Hong Kong) (Uzbekistan) | Wong Chun-hun / Coleman Wong; Sergey Fomin / Khumoyun Sultanov | 7; 5 | 7^{9} 6^{7} |
| 4 | (Hong Kong) (Uzbekistan) | Coleman Wong; Khumoyun Sultanov | 6; 2 | 6; 2 |
| 5 | (Hong Kong) (Uzbekistan) | Wong Tsz-fu; Sergey Fomin | | | | not played |

=== Ireland vs. China ===
Ireland
1
Sport Ireland National Indoor Arena, Dublin, Ireland
13–14 September 2025
Hard (i)

China
3

| | | | 1 | 2 | 3 |
|---|---|---|---|---|---|---|
| 1 | (Republic of Ireland) (China) | Peter Buldorini; Bu Yunchaokete | 4; 6 | 1; 6 |
| 2 | (Republic of Ireland) (China) | Michael Agwi; Zhou Yi | 1; 6 | 7^{7} 6^{1} | 0; 6 |
| 3 | (Republic of Ireland) (China) | Conor Gannon / David O'Hare; Cui Jie / Sun Fajing | 2; 6 | 5; 7 |
| 4 | (Republic of Ireland) (China) | Michael Agwi; Sun Fajing | 0; 6 | 6; 2 | 10; 5 |
| 5 | (Republic of Ireland) (China) | Peter Buldorini; Zhou Yi | | | | not played |

=== Cyprus vs. Monaco ===
Cyprus
1
National Tennis Centre, Nicosia, Cyprus
13–14 September 2025
Hard

Monaco
3

| | | | 1 | 2 | 3 |
|---|---|---|---|---|---|---|
| 1 | (Cyprus) (Monaco) | Stylianos Christodoulou; Valentin Vacherot | 6; 4 | 1; 6 | 1; 6 |
| 2 | (Cyprus) (Monaco) | Melios Efstathiou; Romain Arneodo | 7; 5 | 6; 3 |
| 3 | (Cyprus) (Monaco) | Melios Efstathiou / Eleftherios Neos; Romain Arneodo / Hugo Nys | 3; 6 | 2; 6 |
| 4 | (Cyprus) (Monaco) | Melios Efstathiou; Valentin Vacherot | 2; 6 | 3; 6 |
| 5 | (Cyprus) (Monaco) | Stylianos Christodoulou; Romain Arneodo | | | | not played |

=== New Zealand vs. Georgia ===
New Zealand
3
Central Energy Trust Arena, Palmerston North, New Zealand
13–14 September 2025
Hard (i)

Georgia
1

| | | | 1 | 2 | 3 |
|---|---|---|---|---|---|---|
| 1 | (New Zealand) (Georgia (country)) | James Watt; Zura Tkemaladze | 6; 2 | 7^{7} 6^{2} |
| 2 | (New Zealand) (Georgia (country)) | Jack Loutit; Aleksandre Bakshi | 3; 6 | 3; 6 |
| 3 | (New Zealand) (Georgia (country)) | Ajeet Rai / Finn Reynolds; Aleksandre Bakshi / Aleksandre Metreveli | 5; 7 | 6; 2 | 7^{7} 6^{4} |
| 4 | (New Zealand) (Georgia (country)) | James Watt; Aleksandre Bakshi | 7^{7} 6^{3} | 6; 2 |
| 5 | (New Zealand) (Georgia (country)) | Jack Loutit; Zura Tkemaladze | | | | not played |

=== Slovenia vs. Uruguay ===
Slovenia
4
Tennis Academy Breskvar, Ljubljana, Slovenia
12–13 September 2025
Hard

Uruguay
0

| | | | 1 | 2 | 3 |
|---|---|---|---|---|---|---|
| 1 | (Slovenia) (Uruguay) | Bor Artnak; Joaquín Aguilar Cardozo | 6; 1 | 6; 4 |
| 2 | (Slovenia) (Uruguay) | Filip Jeff Planinšek; Franco Roncadelli | 6; 1 | 7^{7} 6^{5} |
| 3 | (Slovenia) (Uruguay) | Filip Jeff Planinšek / Bor Artnak; Ariel Behar / Ignacio Carou | 6; 3 | 6; 2 |
| 4 | (Slovenia) (Uruguay) | Žiga Šeško; Francisco Llanes | 1; 6 | 7^{7} 6^{4} | 10; 7 |
| 5 | (Slovenia) (Uruguay) | Filip Jeff Planinšek; Joaquín Aguilar Cardozo | | | | not played |

=== South Africa vs. Morocco ===
South Africa
1
Groenkloof Tennis Club, Pretoria, South Africa
13–14 September 2025
Hard

Morocco
4

| | | | 1 | 2 | 3 |
|---|---|---|---|---|---|
| 1 | (South Africa) (Morocco) | Alec Beckley; Yassine Dlimi | 7^{7} 6^{5} | 6^{7} 7^{9} | 2; 6 |
| 2 | (South Africa) (Morocco) | Marc van de Merwe; Taha Baadi | 6; 3 | 1; 6 | 1; 6 |
| 3 | (South Africa) (Morocco) | Alec Beckley / Thando Longwe-Smit; Yassine Dlimi / Younes Lalami | 7^{7} 6^{5} | 3; 6 | 7^{7} 6^{3} |
| 4 | (South Africa) (Morocco) | Connor Doig; Taha Baadi | 3; 6 | 2; 6 |
| 5 | (South Africa) (Morocco) | Leo Matthysen; Karim Bennani | 1; 6 | 2; 6 |

=== Lebanon vs. Barbados ===
Lebanon
4
Palm Hills Sports Club, Cairo, Egypt
12–13 September 2025
Clay

Barbados
0

| | | | 1 | 2 | 3 |
|---|---|---|---|---|---|---|
| 1 | (Lebanon) (Barbados) | Benjamin Hassan; Darian King | 7^{8} 6^{6} | 1; 6 | 7^{8} 6^{6} |
| 2 | (Lebanon) (Barbados) | Hady Habib; Kaipo Marshall | 6; 1 | 6; 3 |
| 3 | (Lebanon) (Barbados) | Fadi Bidan / Hasan Ibrahim; Darian King / Haydn Lewis | 6; 2 | 6; 3 |
| 4 | (Lebanon) (Barbados) | Fadi Bidan; Stephen Slocombe | 6; 1 | 6; 4 |
| 5 | (Lebanon) (Barbados) | Benjamin Hassan; Darian King | | | | not played |

=== Paraguay vs. Pakistan ===
Paraguay
3
Club Internacional de Tenis, Asunción, Paraguay
12–13 September 2025
Clay

Pakistan
1

| | | | 1 | 2 | 3 |
|---|---|---|---|---|---|---|
| 1 | (Paraguay) (Pakistan) | Alex Santino Nuñez Vera; Huzaifa Abdul Rehman | 6; 1 | 5; 7 | 6; 4 |
| 2 | (Paraguay) (Pakistan) | Daniel Vallejo; Muzammil Murtaza | 6; 0 | 6; 2 |
| 3 | (Paraguay) (Pakistan) | Daniel Vallejo / Martín Antonio Vergara del Puerto; Aqeel Khan / Aisam-ul-Haq Qureshi | 3; 6 | 6; 1 | 6; 3 |
| 4 | (Paraguay) (Pakistan) | Martin Antonio Vergara del Puerto; Huzaifa Abdul Rehman | 6; 2 | 4; 6 | 5; 10 |
| 5 | (Paraguay) (Pakistan) | Alex Santino Nuñez Vera; Muzammil Murtaza | | | | not played |

=== Estonia vs. Mexico ===
Estonia
1
Kalev Sports Hall, Tallinn, Estonia
12–13 September 2025
Hard (i)

Mexico
3

| | | | 1 | 2 | 3 |
|---|---|---|---|---|---|---|
| 1 | (Estonia) (Mexico) | Mark Lajal; Luis Carlos Álvarez | 7^{7} 6^{5} | 6; 4 |
| 2 | (Estonia) (Mexico) | Daniil Glinka; Rodrigo Pacheco Méndez | 6; 3 | 2; 6 | 3; 6 |
| 3 | (Estonia) (Mexico) | Mark Lajal / Oliver Ojakäär; Luis Carlos Álvarez / Rodrigo Pacheco Méndez | 2; 6 | 6; 3 | 3; 6 |
| 4 | (Estonia) (Mexico) | Mark Lajal; Rodrigo Pacheco Méndez | 4; 6 | 4; 6 |
| 5 | (Estonia) (Mexico) | Daniil Glinka; Luis Carlos Álvarez | | | | not played |
