= 2018 Davis Cup Asia/Oceania Zone Group I =

International tennis competition

The Asia/Oceania Zone was one of the three regional zones of the 2018 Davis Cup.

In the Asia/Oceania Zone there were four different tiers, called groups, in which teams competed against each other to advance to the upper tier. Winners in Group I advanced to the World Group play-offs, along with losing teams from the World Group first round. Teams who lost their respective ties competed in the relegation play-offs, with winning teams remaining in Group I, whereas teams who lost their play-offs were relegated to the Asia/Oceania Zone Group II in 2019.

== Participating nations ==
Seeds: All seeds received a bye into the second round.

1. India
2. Uzbekistan

Remaining nations:

- China
- New Zealand
- Pakistan
- South Korea

=== Draw ===
Second Round Play-offs
Gimcheon, South Korea (indoor hard)
New Zealand	2
South Korea	3

First Round Play-offs
bye
New Zealand
South Korea
bye

First Round
1	India
bye
Tianjin, China (indoor hard)
China	3
New Zealand	1
Islamabad, Pakistan (grass)
Pakistan	4
South Korea	0
bye
2	Uzbekistan

Second Round
Tianjin, China (hard)
1	India	3
China	2
Islamabad, Pakistan (grass)
Pakistan	1
2	Uzbekistan	4

- New Zealand relegated to Group II in 2019.
- India and Uzbekistan advance to World Group Play-off.

== First round ==
=== China vs. New Zealand ===
China
3
Tianjin Tennis Center, Tianjin, China
2–3 February
Hard (i)

New Zealand
1

			1	2	3
1	(China) (New Zealand)	Wu Di; Rubin Statham	6; 2	4; 6	4; 6
2	(China) (New Zealand)	Zhang Ze; Michael Venus	5; 7	6; 1	6; 2
3	(China) (New Zealand)	Gong Maoxin / Zhang Ze; Marcus Daniell / Artem Sitak	6; 4	6; 4
4	(China) (New Zealand)	Wu Yibing; Rubin Statham	1; 6	6; 3	6; 4
5	(China) (New Zealand)	Wu Di; Michael Venus				not played

=== Pakistan vs. South Korea ===
Pakistan
4
Naval Sports Complex, Islamabad, Pakistan
2–3 February
Grass

South Korea
0

			1	2	3
1	(Pakistan) (South Korea)	Aisam-ul-Haq Qureshi; Kwon Soon-woo	6; 3	1; 6	7^{8} 6^{6}
2	(Pakistan) (South Korea)	Aqeel Khan; Hong Seong-chan	4; 6	7; 5	7; 5
3	(Pakistan) (South Korea)	Aqeel Khan / Aisam-ul-Haq Qureshi; Kwon Soon-woo / Lim Yong-kyu	7^{10} 6^{8}	6; 4
4	(Pakistan) (South Korea)	Mohammad Abid Ali Khan Akbar; Park Min-jong	7^{7} 6^{2}	7^{7} 6^{5}
5	(Pakistan) (South Korea)	Aisam-ul-Haq Qureshi; Hong Seong-chan				not played

== Second round ==
=== China vs. India ===
China
2
Tianjin Tennis Centre, Tianjin, China
6–7 April
Hard

India
3

			1	2	3
1	(China) (India)	Wu Yibing; Ramkumar Ramanathan	7^{7} 6^{4}	6; 4
2	(China) (India)	Zhang Ze; Sumit Nagal	6; 4	6; 1
3	(China) (India)	Gong Maoxin / Zhang Ze; Rohan Bopanna / Leander Paes	7; 5	6^{5} 7^{7}	6^{3} 7^{7}
4	(China) (India)	Wu Di; Ramkumar Ramanathan	6^{4} 7^{7}	3; 6
5	(China) (India)	Wu Yibing; Prajnesh Gunneswaran	4; 6	2; 6

=== Pakistan vs. Uzbekistan ===
Pakistan
1
Naval Sports Complex, Islamabad, Pakistan
6–7 April
Grass

Uzbekistan
4

			1	2	3
1	(Pakistan) (Uzbekistan)	Aisam-ul-Haq Qureshi; Denis Istomin	6^{17} 7^{19}	1; 4		retired
2	(Pakistan) (Uzbekistan)	Aqeel Khan; Sanjar Fayziev	6^{6} 7^{8}	6; 4	6; 4
3	(Pakistan) (Uzbekistan)	Aqeel Khan / Aisam-ul-Haq Qureshi; Denis Istomin / Jurabek Karimov	2; 6	4; 6
4	(Pakistan) (Uzbekistan)	Aqeel Khan; Denis Istomin	1; 6	3; 6
5	(Pakistan) (Uzbekistan)	Muzammil Murtaza; Khumoyun Sultanov	3; 6	1; 6

== Second round play-offs ==
=== South Korea vs. New Zealand ===
South Korea
3
Gimcheon Sports Town Tennis Courts, Gimcheon, South Korea
14–15 September
Hard

New Zealand
2

			1	2	3
1	(South Korea) (New Zealand)	Hong Seong-chan; Rubin Statham	6^{10} 7^{12}	2; 6
2	(South Korea) (New Zealand)	Lee Duck-hee; Michael Venus	7; 5	6^{7} 7^{9}	6; 2
3	(South Korea) (New Zealand)	Hong Seong-chan / Lee Jea-moon; Ajeet Rai / Artem Sitak	5; 7	3; 6
4	(South Korea) (New Zealand)	Lee Duck-hee; Rubin Statham	6; 4	6; 1
5	(South Korea) (New Zealand)	Lim Yong-kyu; Michael Venus	7^{7} 6^{5}	6; 4
