= Islamabad Challenger =

Pakistan Cup
- 2025 Islamabad Challenger

ATP Challenger Tour
- Event name: Pakistan ATP Challenger Cup
- Location: Islamabad, Pakistan
- Category: ATP Challenger Tour
- Surface: Hard

The Pakistan Cup is a professional tennis tournament played on hardcourts. It is currently part of the ATP Challenger Tour. It was first held in Islamabad, Pakistan in 2025.

== Past finals ==
=== Singles ===
Year	Champion	Runner-up	Score
2025	(United Kingdom) Jay Clarke	(Turkey) Mert Alkaya	6–3, 6–1

=== Doubles ===
Year	Champions	Runners-up	Score
2025	(Czech Republic) Dominik Palán (Kazakhstan) Denis Yevseyev	(Pakistan) Muzammil Murtaza (Pakistan) Aisam-ul-Haq Qureshi	7–6^{(7–3)}, 6–4
