= Denis Yevseyev =

Kazakh tennis player (born 1993)

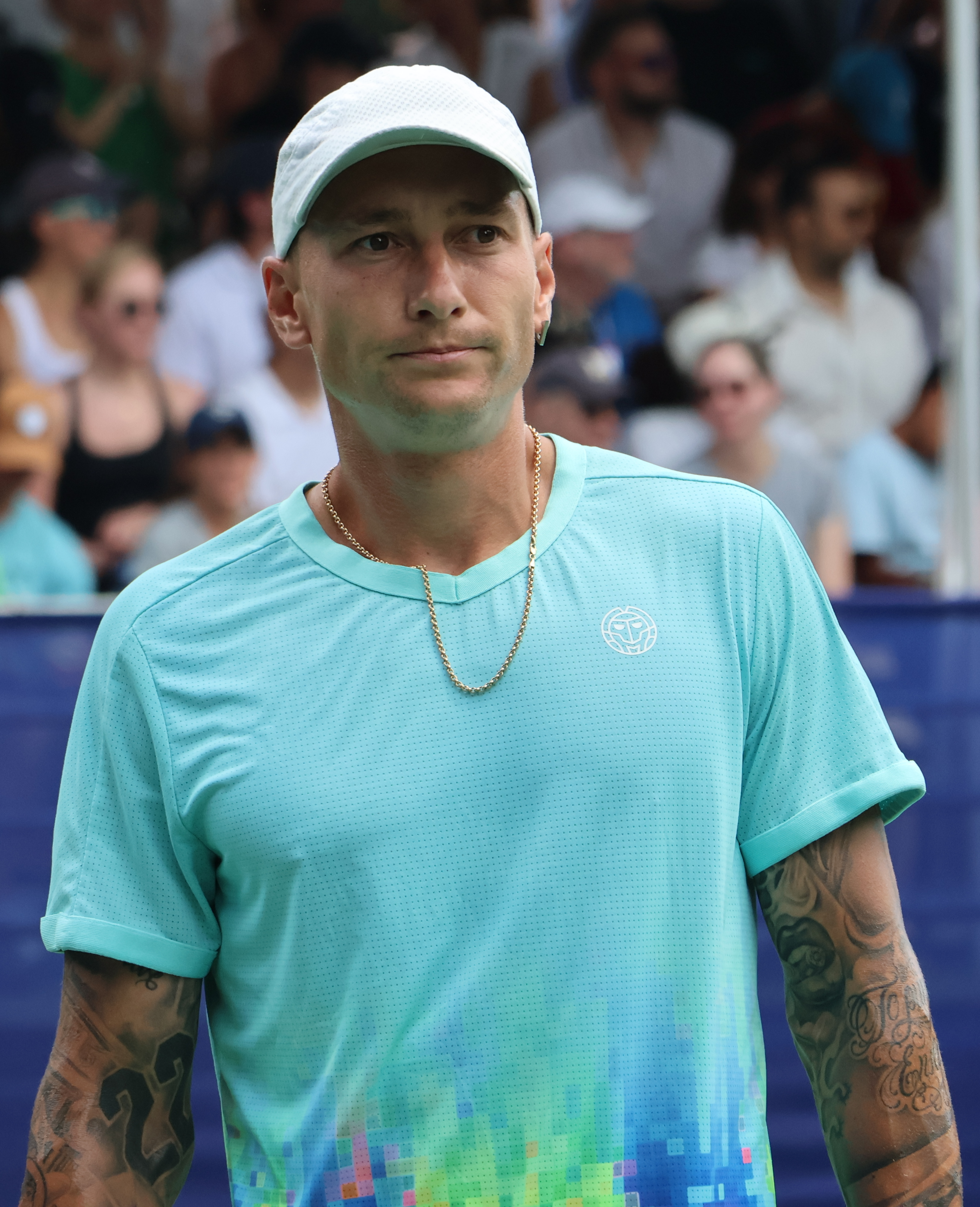
- Yevseyev at the 2024 Washington Open
- Country (sports): Kazakhstan
- Born: 22 May 1993 (age 33) Almaty, Kazakhstan
- Height: 1.88 m (6 ft 2 in)
- Plays: Right-handed (two-handed backhand)
- Coach: Yevgen Tseplyayev
- Prize money: $ 686,311

Singles
- Career record: 2–3 (at ATP Tour level, Grand Slam level, and in Davis Cup)
- Career titles: 0
- Highest ranking: No. 153 (22 July 2024)
- Current ranking: No. 474 (02 November 2026)

Grand Slam singles results
- Australian Open: Q1 (2024)
- French Open: Q1 (2024)
- Wimbledon: Q3 (2024)
- US Open: Q2 (2024)

Doubles
- Career record: 0–3 (at ATP Tour level, Grand Slam level, and in Davis Cup)
- Career titles: 0
- Highest ranking: No. 247 (12 July 2021)
- Current ranking: No. 548 (02 November 2026)
Medal record
Representing Kazakhstan
Men's tennis
Asian Games
Silver medal – second place	2018 Jakarta	Men's doubles
Asian Indoor and Martial Arts Games
Silver medal – second place	2017 Ashgabat	Men's doubles
- Last updated on: 05 November 2026.

Denis Yevseyev (born 22 May 1993) is a Kazakh tennis player who competes on the ATP Challenger Tour. He has a career high ATP singles ranking of world No. 153 achieved on 22 July 2024. He also has a career high ATP doubles ranking of No. 247 achieved on 12 July 2021.

== Career ==
=== 2017-2018: Two-time Silver doubles medalist at the Asian Games ===
He played at the 2017 Asian Indoor and Martial Arts Games in singles but was defeated by Farrukh Dustov in the quarterfinal. In men's doubles partnering Timur Khabibulin, he lost the final and won a silver medal.

Yevseyev participated at the 2018 Asian Games in Jakarta, Indonesia. In singles, he lost to the bronze medalist South Korean Lee Duck-hee in the third round. In doubles, he won the silver medal after losing in the final with his partner Alexander Bublik against the Indian duo of Rohan Bopanna and Divij Sharan.

=== 2019-2020: ATP doubles debut ===
In 2019, Yevseyev was nominated for the Kazakhstan Davis Cup team.

Yevseyev made his ATP main draw debut at the 2020 Astana Open in the doubles draw partnering Mohamed Safwat.

=== 2021-2022: Maiden Challenger final, top 300 ===
In July 2022, he reached his maiden Challenger final at the 2022 President's Cup in Nur Sultan, Kazakhstan. As a result, he reached a new career-high ranking in the top 300 at World No. 269 on 25 July 2022.

=== 2023-2024: Maiden Challenger title, top 155 ===
In July 2023, Yevseyev won his maiden Challenger title at the 2023 President's Cup in Astana, Kazakhstan. He made his debut in qualifying at a Masters 1000 level at the 2023 Rolex Shanghai Masters. He finished the 2023 season ranked No. 190 and reached a new career-high ranking of No. 176 in the top 200 on 29 January 2024.

In July 2024, following a round of 16 showing at the 2024 Swedish Open in Bastad with a win over Alexandre Müller, he reached a new career-high ranking of No. 153 on 22 July 2024. In September, ranked No. 207, Yevseyev qualified for the main draw of the 2024 Hangzhou Open defeating Reilly Opelka and Dalibor Svrčina, but lost to local favorite sixth seed Zhang Zhizhen in the first round. As a result, he returned to the top 200 at No. 197 on 23 September 2024.

=== 2025: Davis cup debut & maiden Challenger doubles title ===
In January 2025 Denis Yevseyev won his first game as a member of Kazakhstan's Davis Cup team against Ahmad Nael Qureshi from Pakistan.

In November 2025, Yevseyev won his maiden Challenger doubles title alongside Czech Dominik Palán at the first ever hosted Pakistani Challenger in Islamabad, Pakistan, on Aqeel Khan Center Court, against former top level doubles player and President of the Pakistan Tennis Federation (PTF) Aisam-ul-Haq Qureshi, who in his farewell match was partnering fellow countryman Muzammil Murtaza.

== ATP Challenger and ITF Tour Finals ==
=== Singles: 16 (9–7) ===
Legend (singles) ATP Challenger Tour (1–1) ITF Futures/World Tennis Tour (8–6)	Titles by Surface Hard (4–5) Clay (5–2)

Result	W–L	Date	Tournament	Tier	Surface	Opponent	Score
Loss	0–1	May 2013	Kazakhstan F4, Shymkent	Futures	Clay	(Russia) Mikhail Biryukov	1–6, 5–7
Loss	0–2	Jul 2014	Kazakhstan F9, Astana	Futures	Hard	(Belarus) Andrei Vasilevski	4–6, 3–6
Loss	0–3	Jul 2017	Russia F4, Kazan	Futures	Hard	(Russia) Pavel Kotov	6–7^{(5–7)}, 2–6
Win	1–3	Aug 2017	Russia F5, Kazan	Futures	Hard	(Russia) Dmitry Mnushkin	6–4, 6–3
Win	2–3	Apr 2018	Kazakhstan F3, Shymkent	Futures	Clay	(Russia) Ivan Gakhov	6–4, 5–7, 6–4
Win	3–3	Apr 2018	Kazakhstan F4, Shymkent	Futures	Clay	(Russia) Pavel Kotov	7–5, 6–1
Win	4–3	Apr 2018	Kazakhstan F5, Shymkent	Futures	Clay	(Russia) Teymuraz Gabashvili	6–2, 6–3
Win	5–3	May 2018	Turkey F20, Antalya	Futures	Clay	(Switzerland) Vullnet Tashi	6–1, 6–0
Win	6–3	Dec 2018	Hong Kong F3, Hong Kong	Futures	Hard	(China) Gao Xin	6–4, 1–6, 6–4
Win	7–3	Jun 2019	M15 Irpin, Ukraine	World Tennis Tour	Clay	(Belgium) Arnaud Bovy	6–1, 6–3
Loss	7–4	Jul 2019	M15 Almaty, Kazakhstan	World Tennis Tour	Hard	(Kazakhstan) Andrey Golubev	1–6, 2–6
Loss	7–5	Sep 2019	M25 Irpin, Ukraine	World Tennis Tour	Clay	(Lithuania) Laurynas Grigelis	0–6, 3–6
Win	8–5	Jan 2022	M25 Vilnius, Lithuania	World Tennis Tour	Hard (i)	(Finland) Otto Virtanen	5–7, 6–3, 7–6^{(7–4)}
Loss	8–6	Jul 2022	Nur-Sultan, Kazakhstan	Challenger	Hard	Roman Safiullin	6–2, 4–6, 6–7^{(2–7)}
Win	9–6	Jul 2023	Astana, Kazakhstan	Challenger	Hard	(Uzbekistan) Khumoyun Sultanov	7–5, 2–6, 6–4
Loss	9-7	Nov 2025	M15 Sharm El Sheikh, Egypt	World Tennis Tour	Hard	(Germany) Vincent Marysko	6-7^{(1–7)}, 1–6

=== Doubles 27 (11–16) ===
Legend
ATP Challengers 5 (1–4)
ITF Futures 22 (10–12)

Outcome	No.	Date	Tournament	Surface	Partner	Opponents	Score
Runner-up	1.	July 14, 2012	Almaty, Kazakhstan F6	Hard	(Uzbekistan) Rifat Biktyakov	(Russia) Vitaly Kachanovskiy (Uzbekistan) Vaja Uzakov	3–6, 4–6
Runner-up	2.	August 18, 2012	Vigo, Spain F24	Clay	(Russia) Alexander Rumyantsev	(Spain) Miguel Ángel López Jaén (Spain) Andoni Vivanco-Guzmán	2–6, 6–7^{(2–7)}
Runner-up	3.	March 17, 2013	Antalya, Turkey F10	Clay	(Russia) Andrei Plotniy	(Sweden) Jesper Brunström (Sweden) Markus Eriksson	3–6, 1–6
Winner	4.	June 22, 2013	Cologne, Germany F6	Clay	(Russia) Andrei Plotniy	(Belarus) Nikolai Fidirko (Belarus) Andrei Vasilevski	6–3, 6–3
Runner-up	5.	August 17, 2013	İzmir, Turkey F32	Hard	(France) Sébastien Boltz	(Argentina) Maximiliano Estévez (South Africa) Tucker Vorster	4–6, 3–6
Winner	6.	October 6, 2013	Antalya, Turkey F39	Hard	(United States) Adam El Mihdawy	(Moldova) Andrei Ciumac (Russia) Kirill Dmitriev	7–5, 6–3
Runner-up	7.	October 19, 2013	Shymkent, Kazakhstan F7	Hard	(Slovakia) Marek Semjan	(Belarus) Sergey Betov (Belarus) Aliaksandr Bury	7–6^{(7–5)}, 3–6, [7–10]
Winner	8.	December 8, 2013	Antalya, Turkey F48	Hard	(Germany) Florian Barth	(Russia) Alexander Mozgovoy (Germany) Sebastian Wagner	6–3, 6–3
Runner-up	9.	March 1, 2014	Aktobe, Kazakhstan F1	Hard (i)	(Georgia (country)) Aleksandre Metreveli	(Belarus) Yaraslav Shyla (Belarus) Andrei Vasilevski	3–6, 6–3, [10–12]
Runner-up	10.	November 6, 2016	Sharm El Sheikh, Egypt F31	Hard	(Ukraine) Yurii Dzhavakian	(Egypt) Karim-Mohamed Maamoun (Ukraine) Vladyslav Manafov	2–6, 3–6
Winner	11.	June 17, 2017	Hua Hin, Thailand F2	Hard	(India) Karunuday Singh	(France) Yannick Jankovits (United States) Evan Song	6–1, 6–1
Winner	12.	August 5, 2017	Kazan, Russia F5	Hard	(Kyrgyzstan) Daniiar Duldaev	(Russia) Markos Kalovelonis (Russia) Alexander Pavlioutchenkov	7–6^{(7–2)}, 6–4
Winner	13.	April 21, 2018	Shymkent, Kazakhstan F4	Clay	(Georgia (country)) Aleksandre Metreveli	(Russia) Denis Klok (Russia) Vladimir Korolev	5–7, 7–6^{(7–4)}, [10–6]
Runner-up	14.	July 22, 2018	Astana, Kazakhstan	Hard	(India) Arjun Kadhe	(Russia) Mikhail Elgin (Belarus) Yaraslav Shyla	5–7, 6–7^{(6–8)}
Runner-up	15.	March 10, 2019	M15 Toulouse, France	Hard (i)	(Russia) Teymuraz Gabashvili	(France) Antoine Escoffier (France) Maxime Tchoutakian	2–6, 5–7
Runner-up	16.	July 14, 2019	M15 Almaty, Kazakhstan	Hard	(United States) Sebastian Korda	(Kazakhstan) Andrey Golubev (Russia) Konstantin Kravchuk	3–6, 2–6
Winner	17.	August 4, 2019	M25 Bolzano, Italy	Clay	(Ukraine) Danylo Kalenichenko	(Italy) Gianluca Di Nicola (Italy) Nicolò Inserra	6–2, 6–2
Winner	18.	August 31, 2019	M25 Irpin, Ukraine	Clay	(Ukraine) Vladyslav Manafov	(Uzbekistan) Sergey Fomin (Uzbekistan) Jurabek Karimov	7–6^{(7–5)}, 5–7, [10–6]
Winner	19.	September 6, 2020	M15 Novomoskovsk, Ukraine	Clay	(Ukraine) Vladyslav Orlov	(Poland) Wojciech Marek (Ukraine) Eric Vanshelboim	6–4, 5–7, [13–11]
Runner-up	20.	November 15, 2020	M15 Heraklion, Greece	Hard	(Russia) Artem Dubrivnyy	(Switzerland) Jakub Paul (Netherlands) Mick Veldheer	1–6, 4–6
Runner-up	21.	January 16, 2021	M15 Antalya, Turkey	Clay	(Ukraine) Vladyslav Orlov	(Argentina) Pedro Cachin (Argentina) Juan Manuel Cerúndolo	5–7, 2–6
Runner-up	22.	March 13, 2021	Saint Petersburg, Russia	Hard (i)	(Russia) Konstantin Kravchuk	(Netherlands) Jesper de Jong (Netherlands) Sem Verbeek	1–6, 6–3, [5–10]
Runner-up	23.	April 3, 2021	Oeiras, Portugal	Clay	(Italy) Riccardo Bonadio	(Germany) Mats Moraing (Germany) Oscar Otte	1–6, 4–6
Winner	24.	January 22, 2022	M25 Vilnius, Lithuania	Hard (i)	(Belarus) Ivan Liutarevich	(Hungary) Péter Fajta (Hungary) Fábián Marozsán	6–4, 7–6^{(7–4)}
Runner-up	25.	July 16, 2022	M25 Nur-Sultan, Kazakhstan	Hard	(Belarus) Ivan Liutarevich	(Estonia) Daniil Glinka (Estonia) Karl Kiur Saar	6–7^{(4–7)}, 3–6
Runner-up	26.	January 11, 2025	Oeiras, Portugal	Hard (i)	(Japan) Kaichi Uchida	(United States) George Goldhoff (United States) Trey Hilderbrand	5-7, 6–2, [5-10]
Winner	27.	November 29, 2025	Islamabad, Pakistan	Hard	(Czech Republic) Dominik Palán	(Pakistan) Muzammil Murtaza (Pakistan) Aisam-ul-Haq Qureshi	7–6^{(7–3)}, 6–4

== Other finals ==
=== Asian Games ===
==== Doubles: 1 (1 runner-up) ====
Outcome	Date	Tournament	Surface	Partner	Opponent	Score
Runner-up	2018	Palembang, Indonesia	Clay	(Kazakhstan) Alexander Bublik	(India) Rohan Bopanna (India) Divij Sharan	3–6, 4–6
