= Muzammil Murtaza =

Pakistani tennis player (born 1999)

- Country (sports): Pakistan
- Born: 12 November 1999 (age 27) Multan, Pakistan
- Height: 1.78 m (5 ft 10 in)
- Plays: Right-handed (two-handed backhand)
- Coach: Mohammad Yaseen, Kamran Khalil
- Prize money: US $9,824

Singles
- Career record: 1–6 (at ATP Tour level, Grand Slam level, and in Davis Cup)
- Career titles: 0
- Highest ranking: No. 1,315 (16 November 2026)
- Current ranking: No. 1,315 (16 November 2026)

Doubles
- Career record: 1–2 (at ATP Tour level, Grand Slam level, and in Davis Cup)
- Career titles: 0
- Highest ranking: No. 722 (16 November 2026)
- Current ranking: No. 722 (16 November 2026)

Team competitions
- Davis Cup: 2–8
Medal record
Men's tennis
Representing Pakistan
Islamic Solidarity Games
Silver medal – second place	2017 Baku	Men's Team
- Last updated on: 16 November 2026.

Muzammil Murtaza (born 12 November 1999), is Pakistani tennis player. Murtaza has a career high ATP singles ranking of No. 1,315 and a doubles ranking of No. 722, both achieved on 16 November 2026. He won the silver medal at the 2017 Islamic Solidarity Games as a member of the Pakistani team in a men's team event.

Murtaza has won one ITF doubles tournament and has reached one ATP Challenger doubles final.

Murtaza has represented Pakistan in Davis Cup, where he has a win-loss record of 2–8.

He participated at the 2018 Asian Games on men's doubles with Muhammad Abid and mixed doubles with Sarah Mahboob Khan.

== ATP Challenger and ITF Tour finals ==
Legend
Challengers (0–1)
ITF Tour (1–0)

Result	W–L	Date	Tournament	Category	Surface	Partner	Opponents in the final	Score
Loss	0–1	Nov 2025	Islamabad, Pakistan	Challenger	Hard	(Pakistan) Aisam-ul-Haq Qureshi	(Czech Republic) Dominik Palán (Kazakhstan) Denis Yevseyev	6–7^{(3–7)}, 4–6
Win	1–1	May 2026	Islamabad, Pakistan	ITF M15	Hard	(Pakistan) Abid Ali Akbar	(Pakistan) Aqeel Khan (Pakistan) Barkat Khan	6–4 2–6 [10–7]

== Davis Cup ==
=== Participations: (0–8) ===
Group membership World Group (0–0) WG Play-off (0–0) Group I (0–7) Group II (0–1) Group III (0–0) Group IV (0–0)	Matches by surface Hard (0–2) Clay (0–3) Grass (0–3) Carpet (0–0)	Matches by type Singles (0–6) Doubles (0–2)

- ▲ ▼ indicates the outcome of the Davis Cup match followed by the score, date, place of event, the zonal classification and its phase, and the court surface.

Rubber outcome	No.	Rubber	Match type (partner if any)	Opponent nation	Opponent player(s)	Score
▼1–4; 6–7 April 2018; Naval Sports Complex, Islamabad, Pakistan; Asia/Oceania Second round; Grass surface
Defeat	1	V	Singles (dead rubber)	Uzbekistan	Khumoyun Sultanov	3–6, 1–6
▼0–4; 5–6 March 2021; Pakistan Sports Complex, Islamabad, Pakistan; World Group I First round; Grass surface
Defeat	2	IV	Singles (dead rubber)	Japan	Yuta Shimizu	1–6, 1–6
▼0–4; 16–17 September 2022; Tennis Club Tulln, Tulln an der Donau, Austria; World Group I First round; Clay surface
Defeat	3	II	Singles	Austria	Filip Misolic	1–6, 6–7^{(4–7)}
Defeat	4	IV	Singles (dead rubber)	Austria	Jurij Rodionov	2–6, 2–6
▼0–4; 3–4 February 2024; Pakistan Sports Complex, Islamabad, Pakistan; World Group I play-off; Grass surface
Defeat	5	III	Doubles (with Aqeel Khan)	India	Yuki Bhambri / Saketh Myneni	2–6, 6–7^{(5–7)}
▼0–4; 1–2 February 2025; Beeline Arena, Astana, Kazakhstan; World Group I Play-off First round; Hard (indoor) surface
Defeat	6	I	Singles	Kazakhstan	Alexander Shevchenko	2–6, 1–6
Defeat	7	III	Doubles (with Aqeel Khan)	Kazakhstan	Alexander Shevchenko / Timofey Skatov	4–6, 6–7^{(1–7)}
▼1–3; 12–13 September 2025; Club Internacional de Tenis, Asunción, Paraguay; World Group II First round; Clay surface
Defeat	8	II	Singles	Paraguay	Daniel Vallejo	0–6, 2–6
