= Dominik Palán =

Czech tennis player (born 2000)

- Country (sports): Czech Republic
- Born: 30 September 2000 (age 26) Hodonín, Czech Republic
- Height: 1.91 m (6 ft 3 in)
- Plays: Right-handed (two-handed backhand)
- Prize money: US $146,667

Singles
- Career record: 0–0 (at ATP Tour level, Grand Slam level, and in Davis Cup)
- Career titles: 0
- Highest ranking: No. 280 (23 October 2023)
- Current ranking: No. 620 (19 October 2026)

Doubles
- Career record: 0–0 (at ATP Tour level, Grand Slam level, and in Davis Cup)
- Career titles: 0; 1 Challenger
- Highest ranking: No. 632 (18 May 2026)
- Current ranking: No. 649 (19 October 2026)
- Last updated on: 19 October 2026.

Dominik Palán (born 30 September 2000) is a Czech professional tennis player. He has a career-high ATP singles ranking of No. 280 achieved on 23 October 2023 and a best doubles ranking of No. 632 achieved on 18 May 2026.

Palán has won one ATP Challenger doubles title at the 2025 Islamabad Challenger.
