= Kimiko Date career statistics =

Career finals
Discipline	Type	Won	Lost	Total
Singles	Grand Slam	–	–	–
Singles	WTA Finals (Note: Formerly known as: Virginia Slims Championships (until 1995); WTA Tour Championships (until 2014))	–	–	–
Singles	WTA Elite (Note: Elite tier: WTA Tournament of Champions (2009–14); WTA Elite Trophy (2015–present))	–	–	–
Singles	WTA 1000 (Note: Formerly known as: Category 4 & 5 & 6 (until 1990); Tier I (until 2009); WTA Premier Mandatory and 5 (until 2021))	1	1	2
Singles	WTA 500 (Note: Formerly known as: Category 3 (until 1990); Tier II (until 2009); WTA Premier (until 2021))	2	2	4
Singles	WTA 250 (Note: Formerly known as: Category 1 & 2 (until 1990); Tier III & IV & V (until 2009); WTA International (until 2021))	5	4	9
Singles	Olympics	–	–	–
Singles	Total	8	7	15
Doubles	Grand Slam	–	–	–
Doubles	WTA Finals	–	–	–
Doubles	WTA Elite	–	–	–
Doubles	WTA 1000	–	–	–
Doubles	WTA 500	–	–	–
Doubles	WTA 250	6	4	10
Doubles	Olympics	–	–	–
Doubles	Total	6	4	10

This is a list of the main career statistics of Japanese tennis player Kimiko Date.

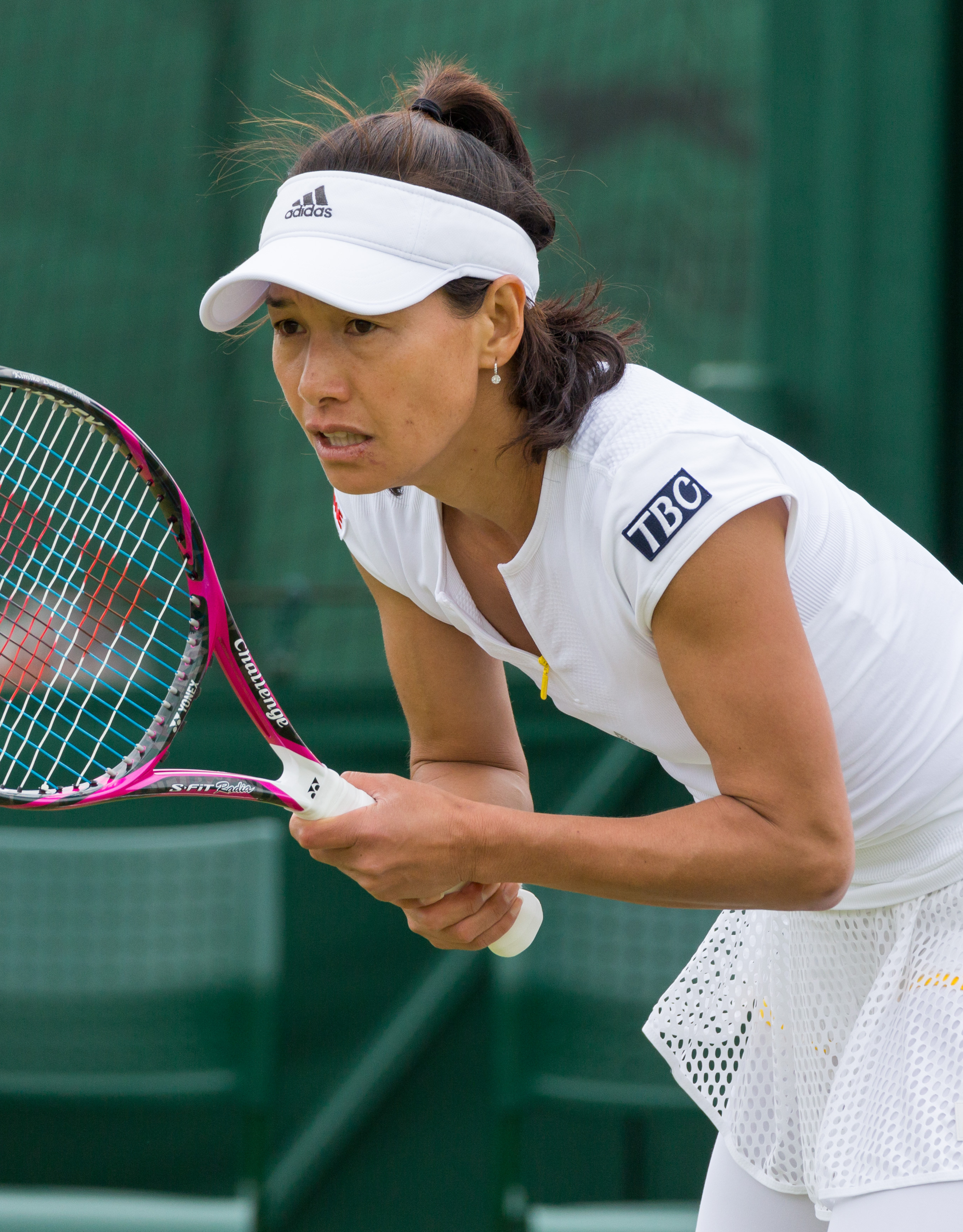
Date at the 2015 Wimbledon Championships.

== Performance timelines ==
Key
W	F	SF	QF	#R	RR	Q#	P#	DNQ	A	Z#	PO	G	S	B	NMS	NTI	P	NH

(W) winner; (F) finalist; (SF) semifinalist; (QF) quarterfinalist; (#R) rounds 4, 3, 2, 1; (RR) round-robin stage; (Q#) qualification round; (P#) preliminary round; (DNQ) did not qualify; (A) absent; (Z#) Davis/Fed Cup Zonal Group (with number indication) or (PO) play-off; (G) gold, (S) silver or (B) bronze Olympic/Paralympic medal; (NMS) not a Masters tournament; (NTI) not a Tier I tournament; (P) postponed; (NH) not held; (SR) strike rate (events won / competed); (W–L) win–loss record.

Only main-draw results in WTA Tour, Grand Slam tournaments, Billie Jean King Cup (Fed Cup), Hopman Cup and Olympic Games are included in win–loss records.

=== Singles ===
Tournament	1989	1990	1991	1992	1993	1994	1995	1996	...	2008	2009	2010	2011	2012	2013	2014	2015	2016	2017	SR	W–L	Win%
Grand Slam tournaments
Australian Open	A	4R	2R	2R	2R	SF	3R	2R		A	1R	1R	1R	1R	3R	1R	1R	Q1	A	0 / 14	16–14	53%
French Open	2R	A	Q2	4R	2R	1R	SF	4R		A	Q1	2R	1R	1R	1R	1R	Q1	A	A	0 / 11	14–11	56%
Wimbledon	1R	2R	1R	2R	A	3R	QF	SF		A	1R	1R	2R	1R	3R	1R	Q1	A	A	0 / 13	16–13	55%
US Open	1R	2R	2R	2R	QF	QF	4R	1R		A	Q2	1R	1R	1R	1R	1R	Q1	A	A	0 / 13	14–13	52%
Win–loss	1–3	5–3	2–3	6–4	6–3	11–4	14–4	9–4		0–0	0–2	1–4	1–4	0–4	4–4	0–4	0–1	0–0	0–0	0 / 51	60–51	54%
Year-end championships
WTA Finals	DNQ					SF	QF	QF	DNQ											0 / 3	4–3	57%
WTA Elite Trophy	DNQ										SF	3rd	DNQ							0 / 2	2–3	40%
National representation
Olympics	NH			2R	NH			QF		A	NH			A	NH			A	NH	0 / 2	4–2	67%
Fed Cup	2R	2R	1R	2R	A	QF	1R	SF		A	A	Z1	A	PO	1R	A	A	A	A	0 / 8	16–8	67%
WTA 1000 + former^{†} tournaments
Dubai / Qatar Open (Note: The first Premier 5 event of the year has switched back and forth between the Dubai Tennis Championships and the Qatar Total Open since 2009. Dubai was classified as a Premier 5 event from 2009 to 2011 before being succeeded by Doha for the 2012–2014 period. In 2015, Dubai regained its Premier 5 status while Doha was demoted to Premier status. The Premier 5 tournaments were reclassified as WTA 1000 tournaments in 2021.)	NH									A	A	A	1R	A	A	A	A	A	A	0 / 1	0–1	0%
Indian Wells Open	NMS							SF		A	A	2R	2R	2R	2R	Q2	Q1	A	A	0 / 5	7–5	58%
Miami Open	A	A	1R	4R	SF	QF	F	QF		A	A	2R	2R	1R	2R	1R	Q1	A	A	0 / 11	20–11	65%
Berlin / Madrid Open (Note: In 2009, the Berlin Open was replaced by the Madrid Open. The Premier Mandatory tournaments were reclassified as WTA 1000 tournaments in 2021.)	A	A	A	A	1R	2R	QF	A		A	A	A	1R	A	A	A	A	A	A	0 / 4	2–4	33%
Italian Open	NMS	A	A	A	A	A	A	A		A	A	A	1R	A	A	A	A	A	A	0 / 1	0–1	0%
Canadian Open	NMS	A	2R	A	A	SF	A	A		A	A	2R (Note: Withdraw during the tournament. Not counted as a loss.)	Q2	A	A	Q2	A	A	A	0 / 3	5–2	71%
Cincinnati Open	NH/NMS										A	1R	Q2	Q1	Q2	Q1	A	A	A	0 / 1	0–1	0%
Pan Pacific / Wuhan Open (Note: In 2014, the Toray Pan Pacific Open was downgraded to a Premier event and replaced by the Wuhan Open. The Premier 5 tournaments were reclassified as WTA 1000 tournaments in 2021.)	NMS				1R	1R	W	2R		Q3	1R	3R	1R	1R	2R	A	A	A	A	1 / 9	8–8	50%
China Open	NMS										A	2R	1R	1R	Q2	A	A	A	A	0 / 3	1–3	25%
Virginia Slims of Florida^{†}	NMS		A	3R	NH/NMS															0 / 1	2–1	67%
Win–loss	0–0	0–0	1–2	4–2	4–3	6–4	12–2	6–3		0–0	0–1	6–5	2–7	1–4	3–3	0–1	0–0	0–0	0–0	1 / 39	45–37	55%
Career statistics
	1989	1990	1991	1992	1993	1994	1995	1996	...	2008	2009	2010	2011	2012	2013	2014	2015	2016	2017	SR	W–L	Win%
Tournaments	5	7	11	15	12	14	13	16		1	11	18	24	14	15	14	6	0	1	Career total: 197		
Titles	0	0	0	1	1	2	1	2		0	1	0	0	0	0	0	0	0	0	Career total: 8		
Finals	0	0	1	1	3	2	4	2		0	1	1	0	0	0	0	0	0	0	Career total: 15		
Overall win–loss	6–5	11–8	13–11	29–14	24–11	33–14	41–12	36–16		0–1	6–11	19–17	7–24	4–14	12–17	11–14	3–6	0–0	0–1	8 / 197	255–196	57%
Year-end ranking	119	79	32	21	13	9	4	–		198	82	46	100	146	54	116	141	802	–	$3,988,378		

=== Doubles ===
Tournament	1989	1990	1991	1992	1993	1994	1995	1996	...	2002	...	2008	2009	2010	2011	2012	2013	2014	2015	SR	W–L	Win%
Grand Slam tournaments
Australian Open	A	1R	A	QF	3R	A	A	A		A		A	A	1R	2R	1R	3R	1R	2R	0 / 9	8–9	47%
French Open	A	A	A	1R	2R	A	A	A		A		A	A	A	2R	1R	2R	2R	2R	0 / 7	5–7	42%
Wimbledon	A	A	2R	1R	A	A	A	A		A		A	A	1R	3R	1R	1R	2R	2R	0 / 8	5–8	38%
US Open	A	A	1R	1R	2R	A	A	A		A		A	A	2R	A	1R	1R	SF	1R	0 / 8	6–8	43%
Win–loss	0–0	0–1	1–2	3–4	3–3	0–0	0–0	0–0		0–0		0–0	0–0	1–3	4–3	0–4	3–4	6–4	3–4	0 / 32	24–32	43%
National representation
Olympics	NH			2R	NH			A		A		A	NH			A	NH			0 / 1	1–1	50%
Fed Cup	2R	2R	1R	2R	A	QF	1R	SF		A		A	A	Z1	A	PO	1R	A	A	0 / 8	5–3	63%
WTA 1000 + former^{†} tournaments
Indian Wells Open	NMS							A		A		A	A	A	A	1R	SF	QF	A	0 / 3	5–3	63%
Miami Open	A	A	A	1R	A	A	A	A		A		A	A	A	A	1R	1R	2R	1R	0 / 5	1–5	17%
Berlin / Madrid Open	A	A	A	A	1R	A	A	A		A		A	A	A	A	A	A	A	A	0 / 1	0–1	0%
Canadian Open	NMS	A	2R	A	A	A	A	A		A		A	A	A	2R	A	1R	2R	A	0 / 4	3–4	43%
Cincinnati Open	NH/NMS												A	A	A	A	2R	SF	A	0 / 2	4–2	67%
Pan Pacific / Wuhan Open	NMS				1R	SF	A	A		A		1R	1R	1R	1R	1R	1R	A	A	0 / 8	2–8	20%
China Open	NMS												A	2R	1R	1R	1R	A	A	0 / 4	1–4	20%
Virginia Slims of Florida^{†}	NMS		A	2R	NH/NMS															0 / 1	1–1	50%
Win–loss	0–0	0–0	1–1	1–2	0–2	2–1	0–0	0–0		0–0		0–1	0–1	1–2	1–3	0–4	4–6	7–4	0–1	0 / 28	17–28	38%
Career statistics
Titles	0	0	0	0	0	0	0	1		0		0	0	0	1	1	3	0	0	Career total: 6		
Finals	0	0	0	1	0	0	0	1		0		0	1	0	1	3	3	0	0	Career total: 10		
Overall win–loss	1–1	1–3	7–8	16–15	6–11	2–1	0–0	5–1		0–1		1–2	4–5	5–7	17–11	15–14	22–14	19–14	7–13	6 /	128–121	
Year-end ranking	243	252	73	51	116	–	–	–		–		221	126	131	55	86	40	34	95			

== WTA Tour finals ==
=== Singles: 15 (8 titles, 7 runner-ups) ===
Legend WTA 1000 (Tier I) (1–1) WTA 500 (Tier II) (2–2) WTA 250 (Tier III / International) (5–4)	Surface Hardcourt (7–5) Clay (0–1) Carpet (1–1)

Result	W–L	Date	Tournament	Tier	Surface	Opponent	Score
Loss	0–1	Aug 1991	LA Championships, US	Tier II	Hard	(Socialist Federal Republic of Yugoslavia) Monica Seles	3–6, 2–6
Win	1–1	Apr 1992	Japan Open, Japan	Tier IV	Hard	(Belgium) Sabine Appelmans	7–5, 3–6, 6–3
Loss	1–2	Feb 1993	Asian Open, Japan	Tier III	Carpet (i)	(Czech Republic) Jana Novotná	3–6, 2–6
Win	2–2	Apr 1993	Japan Open, Japan	Tier III	Hard	(Netherlands) Stephanie Rottier	6–1, 6–3
Loss	2–3	Sep 1993	International Championships, Japan	Tier II	Hard	(South Africa) Amanda Coetzer	3–6, 2–6
Win	3–3	Jan 1994	Sydney International, Australia	Tier II	Hard	(United States) Mary Joe Fernández	6–4, 6–2
Win	4–3	Apr 1994	Japan Open, Japan	Tier III	Hard	(United States) Amy Frazier	7–5, 6–0
Win	5–3	Jan 1995	Pan Pacific Open, Japan	Tier I	Carpet (i)	(United States) Lindsay Davenport	6–1, 6–2
Loss	5–4	Mar 1995	Miami Open, US	Tier I	Hard	(Germany) Steffi Graf	1–6, 4–6
Loss	5–5	Apr 1995	Japan Open, Japan	Tier III	Hard	(United States) Amy Frazier	6–7^{(5–7)}, 5–7
Loss	5–6	May 1995	Internationaux de Strasbourg, France	Tier III	Clay	(United States) Lindsay Davenport	6–3, 1–6, 2–6
Win	6–6	Apr 1996	Japan Open, Japan	Tier III	Hard	(United States) Amy Frazier	6–4, 7–5
Win	7–6	Aug 1996	San Diego Open, US	Tier II	Hard	(Spain) Arantxa Sánchez Vicario	3–6, 6–3, 6–0
Win	8–6	Sep 2009	Korea Open, South Korea	International	Hard	(Spain) Anabel Medina Garrigues	6–3, 6–3
Loss	8–7	Oct 2010	Japan Women's Open, Japan	International	Hard	(Thailand) Tamarine Tanasugarn	5–7, 7–6^{(7–4)}, 1–6

=== Doubles: 10 (6 titles, 4 runner-ups) ===
Legend WTA 250 (Tier III / International) (6–4)	Surface Hardcourt (5–4) Clay (1–0)

Result	W–L	Date	Tournament	Tier	Surface	Partner	Opponents	Score
Loss	0–1	Apr 1992	Japan Open	Tier III	Hard	(United States) Stephanie Rehe	(United States) Amy Frazier (Japan) Rika Hiraki	7–5, 6–7^{(5–7)}, 0–6
Win	1–1	Apr 1996	Japan Open	Tier III	Hard	(Japan) Ai Sugiyama	(United States) Amy Frazier (United States) Kimberly Po	7–6^{(8–6)}, 6–7^{(6–8)}, 6–3
Loss	1–2	Sep 2009	Guangzhou Open, China	International	Hard	(China) Sun Tiantian	(Belarus) Olga Govortsova (Belarus) Tatiana Poutchek	6–3, 2–6, [8–10]
Win	2–2	Oct 2011	Japan Women's Open	International	Hard	(China) Zhang Shuai	(United States) Vania King (Kazakhstan) Yaroslava Shvedova	7–5, 3–6, [11–9]
Loss	2–3	Feb 2012	Monterrey Open, Mexico	International	Hard	(China) Zhang Shuai	(Italy) Sara Errani (Italy) Roberta Vinci	2–6, 6–7^{(6–8)}
Win	3–3	Apr 2012	Danish Open	International	Hard (i)	(Japan) Rika Fujiwara	(Sweden) Sofia Arvidsson (Estonia) Kaia Kanepi	6–2, 4–6, [10–5]
Loss	3–4	Oct 2012	Japan Women's Open	International	Hard	(United Kingdom) Heather Watson	(United States) Raquel Kops-Jones (United States) Abigail Spears	1–6, 4–6
Win	4–4	Feb 2013	Pattaya Open, Thailand	International	Hard	(Australia) Casey Dellacqua	(Uzbekistan) Akgul Amanmuradova (Russia) Alexandra Panova	6–3, 6–2
Win	5–4	Apr 2013	Monterrey Open, Mexico	International	Hard	(Hungary) Tímea Babos	(Czech Republic) Eva Birnerová (Thailand) Tamarine Tanasugarn	6–1, 6–4
Win	6–4	May 2013	Strasbourg, France	International	Clay	(South Africa) Chanelle Scheepers	(Zimbabwe) Cara Black (New Zealand) Marina Erakovic	6–4, 3–6, [14–12]

== WTA 125 tournament finals ==
=== Singles: 1 (runner-up) ===
Result	W–L	Date	Tournament	Surface	Opponent	Score
Loss	0–1	Nov 2012	Royal Indian Open, Pune	Hard	(Ukraine) Elina Svitolina	2–6, 3–6

== ITF Circuit finals ==
=== Singles: 19 (14 titles, 5 runner-ups) ===
Legend $100,000 tournaments (1–1) $75,000 tournaments (3–3) $50,000 tournaments (2–1) $25,000 tournaments (2–0) $10/15,000 tournaments (6–0)	Surface Hardcourt (8–2) Clay (3–0) Carpet (3–3)

Result	W–L	Date	Tournament	Tier	Surface	Opponents	Score
Win	1–0	Nov 1988	ITF Matsuyama, Japan	10,000	Hard	(Japan) Maya Kidowaki	6–3, 6–4
Win	2–0	Nov 1988	ITF Kyoto, Japan	10,000	Hard	(Japan) Maya Kidowaki	7–5, 4–6, 6–4
Win	3–0	Apr 1989	ITF Sutton, United Kingdom	10,000	Clay	(United Kingdom) Samantha Smith	6–2, 6–1
Win	4–0	May 1989	ITF Lee-on-the-Solent, United Kingdom	10,000	Clay	(Hungary) Andrea Noszály	6–4, 6–0
Win	5–0	May 1989	ITF Sutton, United Kingdom	10,000	Clay	(Netherlands) Caroline Vis	6–3, 6–0
Loss	5–1	May 2008	Kangaroo Cup Gifu, Japan	50,000	Carpet	(Thailand) Tamarine Tanasugarn	6–4, 5–7, 2–6
Win	6–1	Jun 2008	ITF Tokyo, Japan	10,000	Hard	(Japan) Shiho Akita	6–3, 6–2
Win	7–1	Jul 2008	ITF Miyazaki, Japan	25,000	Carpet	(South Korea) Chae Kyung-yee	6–3, 6–2
Win	8–1	Aug 2008	ITF Obihiro, Japan	25,000	Carpet	(Thailand) Suchanun Viratprasert	6–3, 7–6^{(7–5)}
Win	9–1	Apr 2009	ITF Monzón, Spain	75,000	Hard	(Romania) Alexandra Dulgheru	7–5, 6–2
Win	10–1	Nov 2009	Toyota World Challenge, Japan	75,000	Carpet (i)	(Serbia) Bojana Jovanovski	7–5, 6–2
Win	11–1	Oct 2011	ITF Poitiers, France	100,000	Hard (i)	(United Kingdom) Elena Baltacha	7–6^{(7–3)}, 6–4
Loss	11–2	Nov 2011	Taipei Ladies Open, Taiwan	100,000	Hard (i)	(Japan) Ayumi Morita	2–6, 2–6
Loss	11–3	Nov 2011	Toyota World Challenge, Japan	75,000	Carpet (i)	(Thailand) Tamarine Tanasugarn	2–6, 5–7
Win	12–3	Jan 2012	ITF Quanzhou, China	50,000	Hard	(Hungary) Tímea Babos	6–3, 6–3
Win	13–3	May 2012	Kangaroo Cup Gifu, Japan	50,000	Hard	(Thailand) Noppawan Lertcheewakarn	6–1, 5–7, 6–3
Loss	13–4	Nov 2012	Toyota World Challenge, Japan	75,000	Carpet (i)	(Switzerland) Stefanie Vögele	6–7^{(3–7)}, 4–6
Win	14–4	Dec 2012	Dubai Challenge, United Arab Emirates	75,000	Hard	(Kazakhstan) Yulia Putintseva	6–1, 3–6, 6–4
Loss	14–5	Nov 2014	Dubai Challenge, United Arab Emirates	75,000	Hard	(Romania) Alexandra Dulgheru	3–6, 4–6

=== Doubles: 14 (7 titles, 7 runner-ups) ===
Legend $100,000 tournaments (0–1) $75,000 tournaments (1–1) $50,000 tournaments (2–2) $25,000 tournaments (0–1) $15,000 tournaments (4–2)	Surface Hardcourt (3–3) Clay (2–1) Grass (1–1) Carpet (1–2)

Result	W–L	Date	Tournament	Tier	Surface	Partner	Opponents	Score
Win	1–0	Oct 1988	ITF Ibaraki, Japan	10,000	Hard	(Japan) Yuko Hosoki	(Japan) Maya Kidowaki (Hong Kong) Paulette Moreno	6–4, 4–6, 9–7
Loss	1–1	Oct 1988	ITF Saga, Japan	10,000	Grass	(Japan) Yuko Hosoki	(Japan) Maya Kidowaki (Japan) Naoko Sato	4–6, 5–7
Win	2–1	Nov 1988	ITF Matsuyama, Japan	10,000	Hard	(Japan) Yuko Hosoki	(Japan) Yasuyo Kajita (Japan) Maya Kidowaki	7–5, 3–6, 7–5
Loss	2–2	Nov 1988	ITF Kyoto, Japan	10,000	Hard	(Japan) Yuko Hosoki	(Japan) Kazuko Ito (Japan) Yasuyo Kajita	4–6, 5–7
Win	3–2	Apr 1989	ITF Sutton, United Kingdom	10,000	Clay	(Japan) Shiho Okada	(West Germany) Aurelia Gheorghe (Netherlands) Caroline Vis	6–3, 6–2
Win	4–2	May 1989	ITF Queen's Club, England	10,000	Clay	(Japan) Shiho Okada	(United Kingdom) Belinda Borneo (Netherlands) Amy van Buuren	7–6^{(2)}, 6–3
Win	5–2	May 2008	Kangaroo Cup Gifu, Japan	50,000	Carpet	(Japan) Kurumi Nara	(United Kingdom) Melanie South; (Netherlands) Nicole Thyssen	6–1, 6–7^{(8)}, [10–7]
Loss	5–3	Jul 2008	ITF Miyazaki, Japan	25,000	Carpet	(Japan) Tomoko Yonemura	(Japan) Misaki Doi (Japan) Kurumi Nara	6–4, 3–6, [7–10]
Win	6–3	Oct 2008	ITF Tokyo, Japan	50,000	Hard	(Japan) Rika Fujiwara	(Chinese Taipei) Chan Chin-wei (Chinese Taipei) Chen Yi	7–5, 6–3
Loss	6–4	Nov 2008	Toyota World Challenge, Japan	75,000	Carpet (i)	(China) Han Xinyun	(Finland) Emma Laine (United Kingdom) Melanie South	1–6, 5–7
Loss	6–5	May 2009	Open Saint-Gaudens, France	50,000	Clay	(China) Sun Tiantian	(Japan) Rika Fujiwara (South Africa) Chanelle Scheepers	5–7, 4–6
Loss	6–6	Oct 2009	Japan Open	100,000	Hard	(Japan) Rika Fujiwara	(Chinese Taipei) Chan Yung-jan (Japan) Ayumi Morita	2–6, 4–6
Win	7–6	May 2011	Nottingham Trophy, United Kingdom	75,000	Grass	(China) Zhang Shuai	(United States) Raquel Kops-Jones (United States) Abigail Spears	6–4, 7–6^{(7)}
Loss	7–7	Jan 2012	ITF Quanzhou, China	50,000	Hard	(China) Zhang Shuai	(Chinese Taipei) Chan Hao-ching (Japan) Rika Fujiwara	6–4, 4–6, [7–10]

== Top 10 wins ==
Season	1991	1992	1993	1994	1995	1996	...	2010	Total
Wins	1	1	3	4	4	6		2	21

#	Player	vsRank	Event	Surface	Round	Score	KDR
1991
1.	(Argentina) Gabriela Sabatini	3	Virginia Slims of Los Angeles, United States	Hard	SF	3–6, 6–1, 6–4	112
1992
2.	(Spain) Arantxa Sánchez Vicario	5	Pan Pacific Open, Japan	Carpet (i)	QF	6–3, 6–4	31
1993
3.	(United States) Mary Joe Fernandez	7	Miami Open, United States	Hard	QF	7–6, 6–3	26
4.	(Germany) Anke Huber	10	US Open	Hard	3R	6–3, 6–2	18
5.	(Czech Republic) Jana Novotná	8	US Open	Hard	4R	6–4, 6–4	18
1994
6.	(Spain) Conchita Martínez	4	Sydney International, Australia	Hard	QF	6–3, 6–0	13
7.	(United States) Mary Joe Fernandez	7	Sydney International, Australia	Hard	F	6–4, 6–2	13
8.	(Spain) Conchita Martínez	4	Australian Open	Hard	QF	6–2, 4–6, 6–3	9
9.	(Spain) Conchita Martínez	3	WTA Tour Championships, United States	Carpet (i)	QF	2–6, 6–4, 7–6	10
1995
10.	(Spain) Conchita Martínez	4	Pan Pacific Open, Japan	Carpet (i)	QF	0–6, 6–2, 6–3	10
11.	(United States) Lindsay Davenport	6	Pan Pacific Open, Japan	Carpet (i)	F	6–1, 6–2	10
12.	(Argentina) Gabriela Sabatini	7	Miami Open, United States	Hard	SF	1–6, 7–6, 7–6	9
13.	(United States) Lindsay Davenport	6	French Open	Clay	4R	6–4, 6–3	9
1996
14.	(Germany) Steffi Graf	1	Fed Cup	Hard	RR	7–6^{(9–7)}, 3–6, 12–10	7
15.	(Germany) Anke Huber	5	Fed Cup	Hard	RR	4–6, 6–4, 6–1	7
16.	(Spain) Conchita Martínez	2	Wimbledon Championships, United Kingdom	Grass	4R	5–7, 7–6, 6–3	13
17.	(Spain) Conchita Martínez	3	Southern California Open, United States	Hard	SF	6–2, 7–5	9
18.	(Spain) Arantxa Sánchez Vicario	2	Southern California Open, United States	Hard	F	3–6, 6–3, 6–0	9
19.	(United States) Monica Seles	1	WTA Tour Championships, United States	Carpet (i)	1R	5–4 ret.	9
2010
20.	(Russia) Dinara Safina	9	French Open	Clay	1R	3–6, 6–4, 7–5	72
21.	(Australia) Samantha Stosur	8	Japan Women's Open	Hard	QF	5–7, 6–3, 7–6^{(7–4)}	56
