= 1996 Japan Open Tennis Championships – Men's doubles =

Men's doubles
- 1996 Japan Open Tennis Championships

Final
- Champions: (Australia) Todd Woodbridge (Australia) Mark Woodforde
- Runners-up: (The Bahamas) Mark Knowles (United States) Rick Leach
- Score: 6–2, 6–3

Details
- Draw: 28 (2Q / 4WC)
- Seeds: 8

Events
Singles	men	women
Doubles	men	women
- Japan Open

The 1996 Japan Open Tennis Championships included this tournament in men's doubles. Mark Knowles and Jonathan Stark were the defending champions but only Knowles competed that year with Rick Leach.

Knowles and Leach lost in the final at 6–2, 6–3 against Todd Woodbridge and Mark Woodforde.

== Seeds ==
The top four seeded teams received byes into the second round.

1. (Australia) Todd Woodbridge / (Australia) Mark Woodforde (champions)
2. (The Bahamas) Mark Knowles / (United States) Rick Leach (final)
3. (United States) Patrick Galbraith / (Russia) Andrei Olhovskiy (quarterfinals)
4. (Canada) Sébastien Lareau / (United States) Alex O'Brien (semifinals)
5. n/a
6. (France) Guy Forget / (Switzerland) Jakob Hlasek (semifinals)
7. (Sweden) Nicklas Kulti / (Australia) Sandon Stolle (first round)
8. (United States) Jim Grabb / (United States) Richey Reneberg (second round)

== Draw ==
Key

- Q = Qualifier
- WC = Wild card
- LL = Lucky loser
- Alt = Alternate
- ITF = ITF entry
- PR = Protected ranking
- SR = Special ranking
- SE = Special exempt
- JE = Junior exempt
- JR = Junior Accelerator Programme entrant
- CO = College Accelerator Programme entrant
- NG = Next Gen Accelerator Program entrant
- w/o = Walkover
- r = Retired
- d = Defaulted

=== Final ===
Semifinals

Final

1
- (Australia) Todd Woodbridge
- (Australia) Mark Woodforde
7
6

6
- (France) Guy Forget
- (Switzerland) Jakob Hlasek
6
3

1
- (Australia) Todd Woodbridge
- (Australia) Mark Woodforde
6
6

2
- (The Bahamas) Mark Knowles
- (United States) Rick Leach
2
3

4
- (Canada) Sébastien Lareau
- (United States) Alex O'Brien

2
- (The Bahamas) Mark Knowles
- (United States) Rick Leach
w/o

=== Top half ===
First round

Second round

Quarterfinals

Semifinals

1
- (Australia) T Woodbridge
- (Australia) M Woodforde
w/o

- (Portugal) J Cunha e Silva
- (France) J-P Fleurian
3
4

- (Germany) D Prinosil
- (United Kingdom) G Rusedski

- (Germany) D Prinosil
- (United Kingdom) G Rusedski
6
6

1
- (Australia) T Woodbridge
- (Australia) M Woodforde
6
6

- (Switzerland) L Manta
- (Netherlands) F Wibier
3
2

- (Zimbabwe) W Black
- (South Africa) K Ullyett
4
0

- (Zimbabwe) W Black
- (South Africa) K Ullyett
6
6

- (Zimbabwe) W Black
- (South Africa) K Ullyett
6
6

- (Australia) J Eagle
- (Australia) A Florent
w/o

- (Australia) J Eagle
- (Australia) A Florent
2
4

7
- (Sweden) N Kulti
- (Australia) S Stolle

1
- (Australia) T Woodbridge
- (Australia) M Woodforde
7
6

6
- (France) G Forget
- (Switzerland) J Hlasek
6
3

3
- (United States) P Galbraith
- (Russia) A Olhovskiy
w/o

- (South Africa) M Ondruska
- (United States) J Waite
6
6
4

- (South Africa) W Ferreira
- (South Africa) G Muller

- (South Africa) W Ferreira
- (South Africa) G Muller
7
3
6

3
- (United States) P Galbraith
- (Russia) A Olhovskiy
1
6

WC
- (Japan) S Iwabuchi
- (Japan) T Suzuki
6
6

6
- (France) G Forget
- (Switzerland) J Hlasek
6
7

WC
- (Japan) T Chaen
- (Japan) D Morii
3
3

WC
- (Japan) S Iwabuchi
- (Japan) T Suzuki
2
6

- (United States) D Pate
- (United States) J Tarango
4
6

6
- (France) G Forget
- (Switzerland) J Hlasek
6
7

6
- (France) G Forget
- (Switzerland) J Hlasek
6
7

=== Bottom half ===
First round

Second round

Quarterfinals

Semifinals

LL
- (France) J Golmard
- (France) L Roux
6
6

WC
- (Japan) T Mori
- (Japan) M Takada
3
3

LL
- (France) J Golmard
- (France) L Roux
4
2

- (United States) S Campbell
- (Belgium) D Norman
6
6
4

Q
- (Italy) N Bruno
- (Italy) G Pozzi
6
6

Q
- (Italy) N Bruno
- (Italy) G Pozzi
7
2
6

Q
- (Italy) N Bruno
- (Italy) G Pozzi
1
6
3

- (Sweden) A Järryd
- (United States) B MacPhie
3
4

4
- (Canada) S Lareau
- (United States) A O'Brien
6
1
6

- (Czech Republic) M Damm
- (Sweden) P Nyborg
6
6

- (Czech Republic) M Damm
- (Sweden) P Nyborg
5
5

4
- (Canada) S Lareau
- (United States) A O'Brien
7
7

4
- (Canada) S Lareau
- (United States) A O'Brien

8
- (United States) J Grabb
- (United States) R Reneberg
6
6

2
- (The Bahamas) M Knowles
- (United States) R Leach
w/o

Q
- (United Kingdom) M Lee
- (United Kingdom) C Wilkinson
3
2

8
- (United States) J Grabb
- (United States) R Reneberg
2
6
4

- (United States) K Kinnear
- (United States) D Randall
6
5
6

- (United States) K Kinnear
- (United States) D Randall
6
4
6

- (Australia) W Arthurs
- (United Kingdom) T Henman
4
7
2

- (United States) K Kinnear
- (United States) D Randall
6
3

WC
- (Japan) H Kaneko
- (Japan) G Motomura
7
3
4

2
- (The Bahamas) M Knowles
- (United States) R Leach
7
6

- (Australia) P Kilderry
- (Australia) P Tramacchi
5
6
6

- (Australia) P Kilderry
- (Australia) P Tramacchi
2
4

2
- (The Bahamas) M Knowles
- (United States) R Leach
6
6
