= 1996 Japan Open Tennis Championships – Men's singles =

Men's singles
- 1996 Japan Open Tennis Championships

Final
- Champion: (United States) Pete Sampras
- Runner-up: (United States) Richey Reneberg
- Score: 6–4, 7–5

Details
- Draw: 56 (7 Q / 5 WC )
- Seeds: 16

Events
| Singles | men | women |
| Doubles | men | women |
| ← 1995 · | Japan Open | · 1997 → |

The 1996 Japan Open Tennis Championships included this tournament in men's singles. Jim Courier was the defending champion but did not compete that year.

Pete Sampras won in the final 6–4, 7–5 against Richey Reneberg.

== Seeds ==
The top eight seeds received a bye to the second round.

1. (United States) Pete Sampras (champion)
2. (United States) Michael Chang (quarterfinals)
3. (Sweden) Thomas Enqvist (quarterfinals)
4. (South Africa) Wayne Ferreira (third round)
5. (Australia) Mark Woodforde (semifinals)
6. (Netherlands) Richard Krajicek (quarterfinals)
7. (Netherlands) Jan Siemerink (second round)
8. (Australia) Todd Woodbridge (third round)
9. (Zimbabwe) Byron Black (first round)
10. (France) Guy Forget (quarterfinals)
11. (Germany) David Prinosil (third round)
12. (Switzerland) Jakob Hlasek (second round)
13. (United Kingdom) Greg Rusedski (third round)
14. (Germany) Bernd Karbacher (first round)
15. (United Kingdom) Tim Henman (first round)
16. (Denmark) Kenneth Carlsen (second round)

== Draw ==
=== Key ===
- Q = Qualifier
- WC = Wild card
- LL = Lucky loser
- Alt = Alternate
- SE = Special exempt
- PR = Protected ranking
- ITF = ITF entry
- JE = Junior exempt
- w/o = Walkover
- r = Retired
- d = Defaulted
- SR = Special ranking

=== Finals ===
Semifinals
1 | (United States) Pete Sampras | 7^{7} | 6
5 | (Australia) Mark Woodforde | 6^{5} | 4
(Germany) Hendrik Dreekmann | 6 | 4 | 6^{4}
(United States) Richey Reneberg | 3 | 6 | 7^{7}

Final
1 | (United States) Pete Sampras | 6 | 7
(United States) Richey Reneberg | 4 | 5

=== Top half ===
==== Section 1 ====
First round
Q | (United States) A O'Brien | 5 | 7 | 3
(France) L Roux | 7 | 5 | 6
(Uzbekistan) O Ogorodov | 6 | 3 | 4
Q | (Sweden) M Norman | 2 | 6 | 6
WC | (Japan) Y Yamamoto | 7 | 4 | 2
16 | (Denmark) K Carlsen | 5 | 6 | 6
10 | (France) G Forget | 6 | 7
(Portugal) J Cunha e Silva | 2 | 5
(France) J Golmard | 4 | 6 | 6^{5}
WC | (Japan) K Miyachi | 6 | 1 | 7^{7}
(Sweden) N Kulti | 3 | 1
WC | (Japan) T Suzuki | 6 | 6

Second round
1 | (United States) P Sampras | 6 | 6
(France) L Roux | 3 | 2
Q | (Sweden) M Norman | 6 | 6
16 | (Denmark) K Carlsen | 3 | 2
10 | (France) G Forget | 6 | 6
WC | (Japan) K Miyachi | 0 | 3
WC | (Japan) T Suzuki | 2 | 1
8 | (Australia) T Woodbridge | 6 | 6

Third round
1 | (United States) P Sampras | 5 | 6 | 6
Q | (Sweden) M Norman | 7 | 4 | 1
10 | (France) G Forget | 6 | 6
8 | (Australia) T Woodbridge | 4 | 4

Quarterfinals
1 | (United States) P Sampras | 3 | 6 | 6
10 | (France) G Forget | 6 | 3 | 4

==== Section 2 ====
First round
(Belgium) J Van Herck | 7 | 6
(Sweden) A Järryd | 5 | 2
(Japan) S Matsuoka | 6 | 7^{7}
(Italy) C Caratti | 1 | 6^{3}
(Germany) C-U Steeb | 2 | 1
13 | (United Kingdom) G Rusedski | 6 | 6 | 6
12 | (Switzerland) J Hlasek | 7^{7} | 3 | 6
Q | (Germany) L Rehmann | 6^{4} | 6 | 0
(Czech Republic) M Damm | 6^{5} | 6^{6}
(Denmark) F Fetterlein | 7^{7} | 7^{8}
(Russia) A Olhovskiy | 6^{3} | 2
Q | (Zimbabwe) W Black | 7^{7} | 6

Second round
3 | (Sweden) T Enqvist | 6 | 6
(Belgium) J Van Herck | 2 | 1
(Japan) S Matsuoka | 7^{7} | 5 | 4
13 | (United Kingdom) G Rusedski | 6^{4} | 7 | 6
12 | (Switzerland) J Hlasek | 3 | 7^{7} | 4
(Denmark) F Fetterlein | 6 | 6^{3} | 6
Q | (Zimbabwe) W Black | 4 | 2
5 | (Australia) M Woodforde | 6 | 6

Third round
3 | (Sweden) T Enqvist | 7^{7} | 6
13 | (United Kingdom) G Rusedski | 6^{4} | 1
(Denmark) F Fetterlein | 3 | 2
5 | (Australia) M Woodforde | 6 | 6

Quarterfinals
3 | (Sweden) T Enqvist | 4 | 5
5 | (Australia) M Woodforde | 6 | 7

=== Bottom half ===
==== Section 3 ====
First round
(Russia) A Volkov | 4 | 4
(France) J-P Fleurian | 6 | 6
WC | (Japan) H Kaneko | 2 | 5
(Slovakia) J Krošlák | 6 | 7
(Australia) S Stolle | 1 | 4
11 | (Germany) D Prinosil | 6 | 6
14 | (Germany) B Karbacher | 2 | 4
(Germany) H Dreekmann | 6 | 6
(Belgium) D Norman | 2 | 6 | 2
Q | (Germany) J Renzenbrink | 6 | 3 | 6
(Italy) G Pozzi | 0 | 6 | 1
(Sweden) T Johansson | 6 | 4 | 6

Second round
6 | (Netherlands) R Krajicek | 6 | 6
(France) J-P Fleurian | 3 | 3
(Slovakia) J Krošlák | 7 | 3 | 4
11 | (Germany) D Prinosil | 5 | 6 | 6
(Germany) H Dreekmann | 6 | 6
Q | (Germany) J Renzenbrink | 1 | 3
(Sweden) T Johansson | 7 | 3 | 3
4 | (South Africa) W Ferreira | 5 | 6 | 6

Third round
6 | (Netherlands) R Krajicek | 7 | 6
11 | (Germany) D Prinosil | 5 | 0
(Germany) H Dreekmann | 6 | 6
4 | (South Africa) W Ferreira | 4 | 3

Quarterfinals
6 | (Netherlands) R Krajicek | 6^{5} | 6^{7}
(Germany) H Dreekmann | 7^{7} | 7^{9}

==== Section 4 ====
First round
(The Bahamas) M Knowles | 1 | 2
(Canada) S Lareau | 6 | 6
Q | (United States) S Campbell | 4 | 7 | 6
Q | (Canada) D Nestor | 6 | 5 | 3
(United States) R Reneberg | 6 | 6
9 | (Zimbabwe) B Black | 3 | 0
15 | (United Kingdom) T Henman | 1 | 4
(United States) J Tarango | 6 | 6
(South Africa) M Ondruska | 1 | 1
(United Kingdom) C Wilkinson | 6 | 6
(Germany) A Rădulescu | 7^{7} | 6
WC | (Japan) G Motomura | 6^{5} | 0

Second round
7 | (Netherlands) J Siemerink | 7^{7} | 2 | 1
(Canada) S Lareau | 6^{4} | 6 | 6
Q | (United States) S Campbell | 1 | 4
(United States) R Reneberg | 6 | 6
(United States) J Tarango | 6 | 6
(United Kingdom) C Wilkinson | 4 | 3
(Germany) A Rădulescu | 2 | 6 | 1
2 | (United States) M Chang | 6 | 3 | 6

Third round
(Canada) S Lareau | 2 | 4
(United States) R Reneberg | 6 | 6
(United States) J Tarango | 7 | 3 | 4
2 | (United States) M Chang | 5 | 6 | 6

Quarterfinals
(United States) R Reneberg | 6 | 7^{7}
2 | (United States) M Chang | 4 | 6^{3}
