= 1995 Japan Open Tennis Championships – Men's doubles =

Men's doubles
- 1995 Japan Open Tennis Championships

Final
- Champions: (The Bahamas) Mark Knowles (United States) Jonathan Stark
- Runners-up: (Australia) John Fitzgerald (Sweden) Anders Järryd
- Score: 6–3, 3–6, 7–6

Details
- Draw: 28 (2Q / 4WC)
- Seeds: 8

Events
Singles	men	women
Doubles	men	women
- Japan Open

Henrik Holm and Anders Järryd were the defending champions, but competed this year with different partners.

Holm teamed up with Sébastien Lareau and lost in the second round to Jakob Hlasek and David Prinosil.

Järryd teamed up with John Fitzgerald and lost in the final 6–3, 3–6, 7–6 to Mark Knowles and Jonathan Stark.

== Seeds ==
The top four seeds received a bye into the second round.

1. (The Bahamas) Mark Knowles / (United States) Jonathan Stark (champions)
2. (Sweden) Jan Apell / (Sweden) Jonas Björkman (semifinals)
3. (United States) Jim Grabb / (United States) Patrick McEnroe (semifinals)
4. (Australia) John Fitzgerald / (Sweden) Anders Järryd (final)
5. (Czech Republic) Martin Damm / (Netherlands) Jan Siemerink (first round)
6. (Sweden) Henrik Holm / (Canada) Sébastien Lareau (second round)
7. (United States) Tommy Ho / (United States) Kent Kinnear (second round)
8. (United States) Mark Keil / (Sweden) Peter Nyborg (second round)

== Draw ==
Key

- Q = Qualifier
- WC = Wild card
- LL = Lucky loser
- Alt = Alternate
- ITF = ITF entry
- PR = Protected ranking
- SR = Special ranking
- SE = Special exempt
- JE = Junior exempt
- JR = Junior Accelerator Programme entrant
- CO = College Accelerator Programme entrant
- NG = Next Gen Accelerator Program entrant
- w/o = Walkover
- r = Retired
- d = Defaulted

=== Finals ===
Semifinals
1	(The Bahamas) Mark Knowles (United States) Jonathan Stark	6	6
3	(United States) Jim Grabb (United States) Patrick McEnroe	4	2
4	(Australia) John Fitzgerald (Sweden) Anders Järryd	6	6
2	(Sweden) Jan Apell (Sweden) Jonas Björkman	3	1

Final
1	(The Bahamas) Mark Knowles (United States) Jonathan Stark	6	3	7
4	(Australia) John Fitzgerald (Sweden) Anders Järryd	3	6	6

=== Top half ===
First round
(Australia) J Eagle (Belgium) D Norman	6	6
WC	(Japan) Masaki Komura (Japan) T Sakai	2	1
(Portugal) J Cunha e Silva (South Africa) S Kruger	0	5
(United States) F Montana (United States) J Pugh	6	7
WC	(Denmark) K Carlsen (Japan) S Matsuoka	5	6	4
7	(United States) T Ho (United States) K Kinnear	7	4	6
(United States) K Jones (United States) D Pate	6	6
(Netherlands) HJ Davids (Netherlands) S Noteboom	3	3
(United States) S Davis (United States) B MacPhie	6	7
WC	(Japan) S Iwabuchi (Japan) T Suzuki	3	6
Q	(Australia) S Draper (Australia) A Kratzmann	6	3	6
5	(Czech Republic) M Damm (Netherlands) J Siemerink	3	6	3

Second round
1	(The Bahamas) M Knowles (United States) J Stark	6	6
(Australia) J Eagle (Belgium) D Norman	3	4
(United States) F Montana (United States) J Pugh	6	6
7	(United States) T Ho (United States) K Kinnear	4	3
3	(United States) J Grabb (United States) P McEnroe	6	3	6
(United States) K Jones (United States) D Pate	3	6	4
(United States) S Davis (United States) B MacPhie	6	3	7
Q	(Australia) S Draper (Australia) A Kratzmann	3	6	6

Quarterfinals
1	(The Bahamas) M Knowles (United States) J Stark	6	6	6
(United States) F Montana (United States) J Pugh	4	7	4
3	(United States) J Grabb (United States) P McEnroe	3	6	6
(United States) S Davis (United States) B MacPhie	6	4	3

Semifinals
1	(The Bahamas) M Knowles (United States) J Stark	6	6
3	(United States) J Grabb (United States) P McEnroe	4	2

=== Bottom half ===
First round
6	(Sweden) H Holm (Canada) S Lareau	3	6	7
(France) G Raoux (Canada) G Rusedski	6	3	5
(Switzerland) J Hlasek (Germany) D Prinosil	6	7
(Germany) A Mronz (Venezuela) N Pereira	2	6
(South Africa) M Ondruska (South Africa) G Stafford	2	7	4
Q	(Sweden) T Enqvist (Romania) A Rădulescu	6	5	6
8	(United States) M Keil (Sweden) P Nyborg	6	6
(United Kingdom) M Petchey (Kenya) P Wekesa	3	3
(United States) M Lucena (India) L Paes	1	6	2
(South Africa) W Ferreira (Australia) P Kilderry	6	1	6
(United States) J Courier (United States) J Tarango	6	6
WC	(Malaysia) A Malik (Japan) G Motomura	3	1

Second round
6	(Sweden) H Holm (Canada) S Lareau	6	3	4
(Switzerland) J Hlasek (Germany) D Prinosil	2	6	6
Q	(Sweden) T Enqvist (Romania) A Rădulescu	3	6	4
4	(Australia) J Fitzgerald (Sweden) A Järryd	6	3	6
8	(United States) M Keil (Sweden) P Nyborg	7	3	3
(South Africa) W Ferreira (Australia) P Kilderry	5	6	6
(United States) J Courier (United States) J Tarango	6	3	1
2	(Sweden) J Apell (Sweden) J Björkman	4	6	6

Quarterfinals
(Switzerland) J Hlasek (Germany) D Prinosil	5	4
4	(Australia) J Fitzgerald (Sweden) A Järryd	7	6
(South Africa) W Ferreira (Australia) P Kilderry	1	2
2	(Sweden) J Apell (Sweden) J Björkman	6	6

Semifinals
4	(Australia) J Fitzgerald (Sweden) A Järryd	6	6
2	(Sweden) J Apell (Sweden) J Björkman	3	1
