= Aqeel Khan =

Pakistani tennis player (born 1980)

Aqeel khan
- Country (sports): Pakistan
- Residence: Karachi, Pakistan
- Born: 30 January 1980 (age 46) Karachi, Pakistan
- Height: N/A
- Turned pro: 1998
- Plays: Right-handed (one-handed backhand)
- Prize money: $14,595

Singles
- Career record: Tour 27–38; Total 105–61
- Career titles: ATP 0 Challengers 0 Futures 7
- Highest ranking: No. 349 (4 October 2004)
- Current ranking: No. 2,079 (18 May 2026)

Doubles
- Career record: Tour 24–21; Total 65–62
- Career titles: ATP 0 Challengers 0 Futures 4
- Highest ranking: No. 613 (29 August 2005)
- Current ranking: No. 1,779 (18 May 2026)
- Last updated on: 18 May 2026.

Aqeel Khan
Medal record

Representing Pakistan

Men's tennis

Islamic Solidarity Games
Bronze medal – third place	2005 Mecca	Singles
Gold medal – first place	2005 Mecca	Doubles
Gold medal – first place	2005 Mecca	Team
Silver medal – second place	2017 Baku	Team

Aqeel Khan (born 30 January 1980, in Karachi) is a Pakistani tennis player. His favourite surface is Grass. He is coached by Pakistani tennis coach Jamil Khan, who is his father. Aqeel Khan is sponsored by Jaffer Brothers (Jaffer Group of Companies).

== Career ==
His career highlights include helping the Pakistan Davis Cup team defeat favourites, New Zealand, in the Davis Cup, by beating Simon Rea, 7–6^{(5)}, 2–6, 3–6, 6–3, 6–2 in the fifth rubber; and reaching the Davis Cup World Group play-offs against Chile in Santiago.

Despite the potential to move further up the rankings, opportunities have been limited due to a lack of funds, and not enough ITF tournaments being played in Pakistan. It means he has to travel to India to play matches.

Aqeel Khan was involved in the longest-known Davis Cup tiebreak to date when losing to Korea's Kim Young-jun in the 2003 Asia/Oceania Group I Relegation play-off 7–6, 4–6, 6–3, 7–6, with the first set tiebreak lasting 36 points. He also holds the record for playing the most ties for Pakistan in the Davis Cup, and has the best doubles partnership, with Aisam-ul-Haq Qureshi, for Pakistan.

His younger brother is Jalil Khan, the Pakistan number 3 and Davis Cupper. He also has another youth tennis playing brother called Yasir Khan.

Aqeel Khan began playing tennis at the age of 9, whilst attending school in Karachi to avoid doing duties as a ball boy. He began playing junior tennis in 1993 at the Pakistan International Junior Championships.

He turned pro in 1998 and played his first Davis Cup match in Islamabad, Pakistan, beating Sanjeev Tikaram of Pacific Oceania, 6–1, 6–3.

In 2002, at the Asian Games, he reached the second round in the singles, doubles and team events. In 2004, he made it to the final of the ITF India 1 Satellite Masters tournament in Gurgaon. He then went on to win two of the three legs of the ITF Satellite Championship in Pakistan, and finished off by winning the Pakistan Satellite Masters in Karachi. He won a singles Futures tournament in Hyderabad, India, and also won the Indian DSCL National tennis championship in New Delhi. Aqeel also won a doubles Satellite title in Pakistan.

In 2005 he won a Satellite title in India and twice made it into the finals. Aqeel Khan also got to two doubles Futures Finals in Iran. He won Bronze in the Tennis singles event at the Islamic Solidarity Games in Mecca, Saudi Arabia 2005, where he also won Gold with Aisam-ul-Haq Qureshi in the doubles, and Gold in team event. Also he played in the Davis Cup playoff against Chile in Santiago, when he was thrashed by then current Olympic medalist Fernando González 6–0, 6–0 6–1 in the first rubber.

He also won a Satellite in India in 2006. In the doubles, he also won the India 2 Masters satellite in Delhi. In the first Indo-Pak tennis series, he and Aisam-ul-Haq Qureshi were beaten in the 5 rubber tournament 3–2. At the 2006 Asian Games, he reached the second round in singles, and paired with Qureshi, he reached the quarter-finals, losing to eventual winners and first seeds Leander Paes and Mahesh Bhupathi 6–2, 6–4.

In 2007, Aqeel Khan won a futures tournament in Ludhiana, India. He represented Pakistan at the Asian tennis championship in Tashkent, Uzbekistan, seeded sixth, but lost in the second round. In the doubles he partnered Indian Aditya Madkekar, but was knocked out at the quarter-finals. He then went on to win his second futures title of the year at Lahore, Pakistan.

In 2008 Aqeel Khan was called up the Pakistan Davis Cup squad and prepared for the hectic Asia/Oceania Group III schedule. During the Davis Cup, he was inspired form, as Pakistan won each tie 3–0 to gain promotion back to Asia/Oceania Group II. He went to New Delhi, India to play in his first Challenger level tournament, however he was knocked out in both singles and doubles in the first round. Later in the year he reach a futures final in New Delhi, India but was defeated. In October, he made it to the doubles final in Lahore, Pakistan.

He returned to Davis Cup action in 2009, and won his rubber against Oman in the first round of the Asia/Oceania Group II. To get some match practice ahead of the Davis Cup match against the Philippines, Aqeel was sent to Malaysia to play in a futures tournament in Kuala Lumpur. He reached the doubles final with Malaysian Si Yew Ming, but were defeated by the first seeds. Without Aisam Qureshi, Pakistan went down in the Davis Cup 3–2 to the Philippines. Aisam's decision to play at an ATP tournament was criticised by Aqeel who felt they were let down by him.

After which opportunities for Aqeel to play aboard were few and far between, mostly being restricted to Davis Cup matches. In 2010, he helped Pakistan beat Hong Kong, only to lose to New Zealand 3–2 in the next round. He also took part in the Commonwealth Games where he reached the second round in the singles and the first round in the doubles. In the Asian Games, he was Pakistan's sole representative in tennis but could go no further than the second round.

In 2011, Pakistan once again beat Hong Kong in the first round of the Davis Cup, but lost 4–0 to South Korea to remain in Group II. Outside of playing tennis, he also coached Sri Lanka in 2011 for their Group III matches, who went on to win every match and gain promotion to Group II for 2012.

In 2026 Khan, aged 46, became the oldest player to win a Davis Cup match above regional level. Later that year he reached the doubles final (the first since 2017) in an ITF tournament in Islamabad with fellow Pakistani Barkat Khan, and the week after he won a singles first round match, becoming the oldest player in the singles ATP ranking.

== Singles finals ==
Legend (singles)
Grand Slam (0)
Tennis Masters Cup (0)
ATP Masters Series (0)
ATP Tour (0)
Challengers (0)
Futures & Satellites (7–5)

Result	W–L	Date	Tournament	Surface	Opponent in the final	Score
Loss	0–1	June 2004	(India) Gurgaon	Hard	(Japan) Norikazu Sugiyama	6–1, 3–6, 4–6
Win	1–1	August 2004	(Pakistan) Islamabad	Clay	(Japan) Toshiaki Sakai	7–6^{(3)}, 7–6^{(5)}
Loss	1–2	August 2004	(Pakistan) Lahore	Grass	(Japan) Toshiaki Sakai	4–6, 6–7
Win	2–2	August 2004	(Pakistan) Lahore	Grass	(Japan) Toshiaki Sakai	1–6, 6–4, 6–3
Win	3–2	September 2004	(Pakistan) Karachi	Hard	(Italy) Tommaso Sanna	6–3, 6–4
Win	4–2	September 2004	(India) Hyderabad	Hard	(Chinese Taipei) Tai-Wei Liu	6–7^{(5)}, 6–1, 6–1
Loss	4–3	August 2006	(India) Delhi	Hard	(Australia) Yuri Bezeruk	6–7, 2–6
Win	5–3	August 2006	(India) Delhi	Hard	(India) Ravishankar Pathanjali	7–6^{(7)}, 6–4
Loss	5–4	August 2006	(India) Delhi	Hard	(India) Divij Sharan	5–7, 4–6
Win	6–4	August 2007	(India) Ludhiana	Hard	(India) Aditya Madkekar	6–3, 7–6^{(5)}
Win	7–4	October 2007	(Pakistan) Lahore	Grass	(India) Divij Sharan	4–6, 6–3, 6–4
Loss	7–5	September 2008	(India) New Delhi	Hard	(Germany) Peter Gojowczyk	1–6, 6–7

== Doubles finals ==
Legend (doubles)
Grand Slam (0)
Tennis Masters Cup (0)
ATP Masters Series (0)
ATP Tour (0)
Challengers (0)
Futures & Satellites (4–8)

Result	W–L	Date	Tournament	Surface	Partner	Opponents in the final	Score
Loss	0–1	August 2004	(Pakistan) Lahore	Grass	(India) Vijay Kannan	(United States) Mirko Pehar (Japan) Toshiaki Sakai	4–6, 6–7
Loss	0–2	August 2004	(Pakistan) Lahore	Grass	(India) Vijay Kannan	(United States) Mirko Pehar (Japan) Toshiaki Sakai	2–6, 4–6
Win	1–2	September 2004	(Pakistan) Karachi	Hard	(India) Vijay Kannan	(India) Jaco Mathew (Japan) Atsufumi Yoshikawa	7–6^{(5)}, 6–4
Loss	1–3	August 2005	(Iran) Tehran	Clay	(Pakistan) Asaf Shafik	(Monaco) Benjamin Balleret (France) Clément Morel	2–6, 5–7
Loss	1–4	August 2005	(Iran) Tehran	Clay	(Pakistan) Asaf Shafik	(Iran) Anoosha Shahgholi (Iran) Ashkan Shokoofi	4–6, 4–6
Win	2–4	September 2006	(India) Delhi	Hard	(India) Vishal Punna	(India) Divij Sharan (India) Naveep Singh	6–3, 6–4
Loss	2–5	October 2007	(Pakistan) Lahore	Grass	(India) Sunil-Kumar Sipaeya	(Sri Lanka) Harshana Godamanne (Belgium) Bart Govaerts	4–6, 6–3 [6–10]
Loss	2–6	October 2008	(Pakistan) Lahore	Hard	(India) Sunil-Kumar Sipaeya	(South Korea) Hyun-Soo Lim (India) Rupesh Roy	7–6, 4–6 [6–10]
Loss	2–7	June 2009	(Malaysia) Kuala Lumpur	Hard	(Malaysia) Si Yew Ming	(Chinese Taipei) Tsung-Hua Yang (China) Xin-Yuan Yu	6–7, 3–6
Win	3–7	December 2017	(Pakistan) Islamabad	Clay	(Pakistan) Shahzad Khan	(France) Luka Pavlovic (Spain) Pere Riba	7–6^{(7–3)}, 7–6^{(7–4)}
Win	4–7	December 2017	(Pakistan) Islamabad	Clay	(Pakistan) Shahzad Khan	(Russia) Anton Chekhov (Ukraine) Alexander Lebedyn	7–6^{(7–5)}, 3–6, [10–5]
Loss	4–8	May 2026	(Pakistan) Islamabad	Hard	(Pakistan) Barkat Khan	(Pakistan) Abid Ali Akbar (Pakistan) Muzammil Murtaza	4–6 6–2 [7–10]

== Other career finals ==
=== Doubles ===
Outcome	No.	Date	Tournament	Surface	Partner	Opponents in the final	Score in the final
Winner	1.	19 April 2005	Islamic Solidarity Games, Ta'if, Saudi Arabia	Hard	(Pakistan) Aisam-ul-Haq Qureshi	(Indonesia) Prima Simpatiaji (Indonesia) Suwandi	7–6, 7–6
