= 1995 Japan Open Tennis Championships – Men's singles =

Men's singles
- 1995 Japan Open Tennis Championships

Final
- Champion: (United States) Jim Courier
- Runner-up: (United States) Andre Agassi
- Score: 6–3, 6–4

Details
- Draw: 56 (7 Q / 5 WC )
- Seeds: 16

Events
Singles	men	women
Doubles	men	women
- Japan Open

Pete Sampras was the defending champion, but did not participate.

Jim Courier won the title, defeating Andre Agassi 6–3, 6–4 in the final.

== Seeds ==
The top eight seeds received a bye into the second round.

1. (United States) Andre Agassi (final)
2. (United States) Michael Chang (semifinals)
3. (South Africa) Wayne Ferreira (semifinals)
4. (United States) Jim Courier (champion)
5. (Sweden) Thomas Enqvist (quarterfinals)
6. (Sweden) Jonas Björkman (quarterfinals)
7. (Russia) Alexander Volkov (withdrew)
8. (Netherlands) Jan Siemerink (second round)
9. (Czech Republic) Martin Damm (first round)
10. (United States) Jonathan Stark (first round)
11. (United States) Patrick McEnroe (first round)
12. (France) Lionel Roux (second round)
13. (United States) Jeff Tarango (third round)
14. (Canada) Greg Rusedski (third round)
15. (Canada) Sébastien Lareau (third round)
16. (Denmark) Kenneth Carlsen (third round)

== Draw ==
Key

- Q = Qualifier
- WC = Wild card
- LL = Lucky loser
- Alt = Alternate
- ITF = ITF entry
- PR = Protected ranking
- SR = Special ranking
- SE = Special exempt
- JE = Junior exempt
- JR = Junior Accelerator Programme entrant
- CO = College Accelerator Programme entrant
- NG = Next Gen Accelerator Program entrant
- w/o = Walkover
- r = Retired
- d = Defaulted

=== Finals ===
Quarterfinals
1	(United States) Andre Agassi	6	6
Q	(Australia) Scott Draper	4	3
3	(South Africa) Wayne Ferreira	6	6
6	(Sweden) Jonas Björkman	3	2
5	(Sweden) Thomas Enqvist	6^{4}	0
4	(United States) Jim Courier	7^{7}	6
(Sweden) Jan Apell	6	6^{7}	3
2	(United States) Michael Chang	4	7^{9}	6

Semifinals
1	(United States) Andre Agassi	7	6
3	(South Africa) Wayne Ferreira	5	2
4	(United States) Jim Courier	6	7
2	(United States) Michael Chang	4	5

Final
1	(United States) Andre Agassi	3	4
4	(United States) Jim Courier	6	6

=== Top half ===
==== Section 1 ====
First round
(United States) T Ho	6	6
(South Africa) M Ondruska	3	3
(Germany) C Arriens	7	6
(India) L Paes	5	3
(The Bahamas) R Smith	3	3
15	(Canada) S Lareau	6	6
10	(United States) J Stark	3	6^{5}
Q	(Australia) S Draper	6	7^{7}
(Germany) P Baur	1	2
(Germany) D Prinosil	6	6
(United States) M Joyce	7^{7}	6
LL	(Belgium) D Norman	6^{5}	3

Second round
1	(United States) A Agassi	6	6
(United States) T Ho	3	2
(Germany) C Arriens	5	1
15	(Canada) S Lareau	7	6
Q	(Australia) S Draper	7^{7}	6
(Germany) D Prinosil	6^{5}	4
(United States) M Joyce	7	6
LL	(Netherlands) HJ Davids	5	3

Third round
1	(United States) A Agassi	6	7
15	(Canada) S Lareau	3	5
Q	(Australia) S Draper	6	6
(United States) M Joyce	1	4

Quarterfinals
1	(United States) A Agassi	6	6
Q	(Australia) S Draper	4	3

==== Section 2 ====
First round
(France) G Raoux	2	3
(Ukraine) D Poliakov	6	6
Q	(Nigeria) S Ladipo	4	6	6
(Venezuela) N Pereira	6	4	1
WC	(Japan) S Iwabuchi	1	3
13	(United States) J Tarango	6	6
12	(France) L Roux	6	6
WC	(Japan) T Suzuki	4	4
Q	(United States) S Campbell	6	6
(Italy) L Tieleman	1	4
(Kenya) P Wekesa	3	5
Q	(Czech Republic) L Němeček	6	7

Second round
3	(South Africa) W Ferreira	6	6
(Ukraine) D Poliakov	1	3
Q	(Nigeria) S Ladipo	2	3
13	(United States) J Tarango	6	6
12	(France) L Roux	4	7	2
Q	(United States) S Campbell	6	5	6
Q	(Czech Republic) L Němeček	3	3
6	(Sweden) J Björkman	6	6

Third round
3	(South Africa) W Ferreira	6	3	6
13	(United States) J Tarango	3	6	3
Q	(United States) S Campbell	1	4
6	(Sweden) J Björkman	6	6

Quarterfinals
3	(South Africa) W Ferreira	6	6
6	(Sweden) J Björkman	3	2

=== Bottom half ===
==== Section 3 ====
First round
WC	(Japan) G Motomura	6	6
WC	(Japan) T Sakai	4	2
(Germany) L Rehmann	6^{3}	3
(France) L Barthez	7^{7}	6
(Australia) W Masur	6	6
11	(United States) P McEnroe	2	4
14	(Canada) G Rusedski	6	6
Q	(Australia) P Kilderry	3	3
(Slovakia) J Krošlák	7^{7}	6
(Germany) A Mronz	6^{5}	2
(Sweden) A Järryd	6	5	6
(Mexico) L Herrera	2	7	1

Second round
5	(Sweden) T Enqvist	6	6
WC	(Japan) G Motomura	2	3
(France) L Barthez	3	6	2
(Australia) W Masur	6	3	6
14	(Canada) G Rusedski	6	7^{7}
(Slovakia) J Krošlák	3	6^{2}
(Sweden) A Järryd	6	4	5
4	(United States) J Courier	4	6	7

Third round
5	(Sweden) T Enqvist	6	6
(Australia) W Masur	4	0
14	(Canada) G Rusedski	6	6^{7}	4
4	(United States) J Courier	4	7^{9}	6

Quarterfinals
5	(Sweden) T Enqvist	6^{4}	0
4	(United States) J Courier	7^{7}	6

==== Section 4 ====
First round
(Sweden) J Apell	7^{7}	7^{7}
(United States) J Grabb	6^{3}	6^{3}
Q	(United States) D Pate	2	6	3
WC	(Japan) K Miyachi	6	2	6
Q	(Netherlands) S Noteboom	6	6
9	(Czech Republic) M Damm	3	1
16	(Denmark) K Carlsen	6	6
(Sweden) T Nydahl	4	2
(Switzerland) J Hlasek	7	6
(United Kingdom) M Petchey	5	1
(Japan) S Matsuoka	4	6	7^{7}
(Sweden) H Holm	6	3	6^{5}

Second round
8	(Netherlands) J Siemerink	4	4
(Sweden) J Apell	6	6
WC	(Japan) K Miyachi	6	7^{7}
Q	(Netherlands) S Noteboom	3	6^{4}
16	(Denmark) K Carlsen	6	7
(Switzerland) J Hlasek	4	5
(Japan) S Matsuoka	4	2
2	(United States) M Chang	6	6

Third round
(Sweden) J Apell	6	6
WC	(Japan) K Miyachi	2	3
16	(Denmark) K Carlsen	7^{9}	3	4
2	(United States) M Chang	6^{7}	6	6

Quarterfinals
(Sweden) J Apell	6	6^{7}	3
2	(United States) M Chang	4	7^{9}	6
