= Tennis at the 2005 Islamic Solidarity Games =

Tennis at the 2005 Islamic Solidarity Games was held at the King Fahd Sporting City, Ta'if from April 12 to April 19, 2005.

== Medalists ==
Event	Gold	Silver	Bronze
Singles	Aisam-ul-Haq Qureshi; Pakistan	Mohammad Ghareeb; Kuwait	Slimane Saoudi; Algeria
Singles	Aisam-ul-Haq Qureshi; Pakistan	Mohammad Ghareeb; Kuwait	Aqeel Khan; Pakistan
Doubles	Pakistan; Aqeel Khan; Aisam-ul-Haq Qureshi	Indonesia; Prima Simpatiaji; Suwandi	Turkey; Haluk Akkoyun; Barış Ergüden
Doubles	Pakistan; Aqeel Khan; Aisam-ul-Haq Qureshi	Indonesia; Prima Simpatiaji; Suwandi	Algeria; Abdelhak Hameurlaine; Slimane Saoudi
Team	Pakistan; Wasif Cheema; Aqeel Khan; Nomi Qamar; Aisam-ul-Haq Qureshi; Asim Shafik	Algeria; Abdelhak Hameurlaine; Slimane Saoudi	Indonesia; Prima Simpatiaji; Suwandi; Sunu Wahyu Trijati
Team	Pakistan; Wasif Cheema; Aqeel Khan; Nomi Qamar; Aisam-ul-Haq Qureshi; Asim Shafik	Algeria; Abdelhak Hameurlaine; Slimane Saoudi	Saudi Arabia; Bader Al-Muqail; Fahad Al-Saad

== Medal table ==
Rank	Nation	Gold	Silver	Bronze	Total
1	Pakistan (PAK)	3	0	1	4
2	Algeria (ALG)	0	1	2	3
3	Indonesia (INA)	0	1	1	2
4	Kuwait (KUW)	0	1	0	1
5	Saudi Arabia (KSA)	0	0	1	1
5	Turkey (TUR)	0	0	1	1
Totals (6 entries)		3	3	6	12
