= 1995 Japan Open Tennis Championships – Women's doubles =

Women's doubles
- 1995 Japan Open Tennis Championships
- 1994 Champions: (Japan) Mami Donoshiro; (Japan) Ai Sugiyama

Final
- Champions: (Japan) Miho Saeki; (Japan) Yuka Yoshida
- Runners-up: (Japan) Kyōko Nagatsuka; (Japan) Ai Sugiyama
- Score: 6–7^{(5–7)}, 6–4, 7–6^{(7–5)}

Events
Singles	men	women
Doubles	men	women
← 1994 ·	Japan Open Tennis Championships	· 1996 →

Mami Donoshiro and Ai Sugiyama were the defending champions but they competed with different partners that year, Donoshiro with Yoriko Yamagishi and Sugiyama with Kyōko Nagatsuka.

Donoshiro and Yamagishi lost in the first round to Saori Obata and Nami Urabe.

Nagatsuka and Sugiyama lost in the final 6–7^{(5–7)}, 6–4, 7–6^{(7–5)} against Miho Saeki and Yuka Yoshida.

== Seeds ==
Champion seeds are indicated in bold text while text in italics indicates the round in which those seeds were eliminated.

1. (Australia) Kristine Radford / (Australia) Rennae Stubbs (first round)
2. (Japan) Kyōko Nagatsuka / (Japan) Ai Sugiyama (final)
3. (United States) Patty Fendick / (United States) Marianne Werdel-Witmeyer (semifinals)
4. (Slovakia) Janette Husárová / (Australia) Rachel McQuillan (semifinals)

== Draw ==
=== Key ===
- Q = Qualifier
- WC = Wild card
- LL = Lucky loser
- Alt = Alternate
- ITF = ITF entry
- PR = Protected ranking
- SR = Special ranking
- SE = Special exempt
- JE = Junior exempt
- JR = Junior Accelerator Programme entrant
- CO = College Accelerator Programme entrant
- NG = Next Gen Accelerator Program entrant
- w/o = Walkover
- r = Retired
- d = Defaulted

First round

Quarterfinals

Semifinals

Final

1
- (Australia) K Radford
- (Australia) R Stubbs
**7^{7}**
3
3

- (South Korea) **I-S Kim**
- (South Korea) **S-H Park**
6^{3}
**6**
**6**

- (South Korea) I-S Kim
- (South Korea) S-H Park
3
5

- (Japan) **M Saeki**
- (Japan) **Y Yoshida**
**6**
**6**

- (Japan) **M Saeki**
- (Japan) **Y Yoshida**
**6**
**7**

Q
- (Japan) K Shibata
- (Japan) K Takuma
4
4

- (Japan) **M Saeki**
- (Japan) **Y Yoshida**
**6**
**7**

3
- (United States) **P Fendick**
- (United States) **M Werdel-Witmeyer**
**6**
**6**

3
- (United States) P Fendick
- (United States) M Werdel-Witmeyer
1
5

- (Japan) H Mochizuki
- (Japan) Y Tanaka
2
3

3
- (United States) **P Fendick**
- (United States) **M Werdel-Witmeyer**
**6**
**6**

- (Japan) M Donoshiro
- (Japan) Y Yamagishi
4
**6**
3

WC
- (Japan) S Obata
- (Japan) N Urabe
0
4

WC
- (Japan) **S Obata**
- (Japan) **N Urabe**
**6**
1
**6**

- (Japan) **Miho Saeki**
- (Japan) **Yuka Yoshida**
6^{5}
**6**
**7^{7}**

- (Japan) Y Kamio
- (Japan) N Kijimuta
**6**
3
6^{5}

2
- (Japan) Kyōko Nagatsuka
- (Japan) Ai Sugiyama
**7^{7}**
4
6^{5}

- (Japan) **E Iida**
- (Japan) **H Nagano**
3
**6**
**7^{7}**

- (Japan) E Iida
- (Japan) H Nagano
1
**7^{7}**
1

- (Australia) A Ellwood
- (Canada) V Webb
2
4

4
- (Slovakia) **J Husárová**
- (Australia) **R McQuillan**
**6**
6^{3}
**6**

4
- (Slovakia) **J Husárová**
- (Australia) **R McQuillan**
**6**
**6**

4
- (Slovakia) J Husárová
- (Australia) R McQuillan
3
3

- (United States) **A Frazier**
- (Japan) **R Hiraki**
**6**
**6**

2
- (Japan) **K Nagatsuka**
- (Japan) **A Sugiyama**
**6**
**6**

- (Canada) M Drake
- (Czech Republic) K Kroupová
2
0

- (United States) A Frazier
- (Japan) R Hiraki
4
2

- (Italy) R Grande
- (France) N van Lottum
4
4

2
- (Japan) **K Nagatsuka**
- (Japan) **A Sugiyama**
**6**
**6**

2
- (Japan) **K Nagatsuka**
- (Japan) **A Sugiyama**
**6**
**6**
