= Nicola Bruno =

Italian tennis player

- Country (sports): Italy
- Born: 26 January 1971 (age 54); Lodi, Italy
- Height: 1.78 m (5 ft 10 in)
- Turned pro: 1991
- Plays: Right-handed
- Prize money: $171,486

Singles
- Career record: 1–5
- Career titles: 0
- Highest ranking: No. 169 (11 May 1992)

Doubles
- Career record: 4–10
- Career titles: 0
- Highest ranking: No. 133 (16 September 1996)

Grand Slam doubles results
- Wimbledon: 2R (1996)

Nicole Bruno (born 26 January 1971) is a former professional tennis player from Italy.

== Career ==
Bruno, with countryman Massimo Ardinghi, competed in the men's doubles at the 1996 Wimbledon Championships. They defeated Scott Draper and Javier Sánchez in the opening round, before losing to the Dutch pairing of Tom Kempers and Tom Nijssen in the second round.

He was a doubles quarter-finalist, with Gianluca Pozzi, at the 1996 Japan Open Tennis Championships. This was his best result on the ATP Tour, but he did win four Challenger doubles titles.

== Challenger titles ==
=== Singles: (1) ===
No.	Year	Tournament	Surface	Opponent	Score
1.	1992	Gramado, Brazil	Hard	(United States) Richard Matuszewski	6–2, 6–2

=== Doubles: (4) ===
No.	Year	Tournament	Surface	Partner	Opponents	Score
1.	1989	Salerno, Italy	Clay	(Italy) Federico Mordegan	(Switzerland) Stefano Mezzadri (Italy) Ugo Pigato	
2.	1996	Olbia, Sardinia	Hard	(France) Stephane Simian	(United States) Geoff Grant (Venezuela) Maurice Ruah	7–5, 6–4
3.	1997	Wolfsburg, Germany	Carpet	(Italy) Laurence Tieleman	(Sweden) Henrik Holm (Sweden) Nils Holm	7–6, 6–4
4.	2001	Milan, Italy	Carpet	(Italy) Gianluca Pozzi	(Italy) Daniele Bracciali (Italy) Federico Luzzi	2–6, 7–6^{(2)}, 6–3
