= 1992 Suntory Japan Open Tennis Championships – Men's doubles =

Men's doubles
- 1992 Suntory Japan Open Tennis Championships

Final
- Champion: (United States) Kelly Jones; (United States) Rick Leach
- Runner-up: (Australia) John Fitzgerald; (Sweden) Anders Järryd
- Score: 0–6, 7–5, 6–3

Details
- Draw: 28 (2Q)
- Seeds: 8

Events
Singles	men	women
Doubles	men	women
- Japan Open

Stefan Edberg and Todd Woodbridge were the defending champions, but lost in the quarterfinals to Grant Connell and Glenn Michibata.

Kelly Jones and Rick Leach won the title, defeating John Fitzgerald and Anders Järryd in the final, 0–6, 7–5, 6–3.

== Seeds ==
The top four seeds received a bye into the second round.

1. (Australia) John Fitzgerald / (Sweden) Anders Järryd (final)
2. (Canada) Grant Connell / (Canada) Glenn Michibata (semifinals)
3. (United States) Kelly Jones / (United States) Rick Leach (champion)
4. (United States) Jim Grabb / (United States) David Pate (quarterfinals)
5. (United States) Kent Kinnear / (United States) Sven Salumaa (second round)
6. (United States) Kevin Curren / (South Africa) Gary Muller (semifinals)
7. (Sweden) Stefan Edberg / (Australia) Todd Woodbridge (quarterfinals)
8. (Australia) Mark Kratzmann / (Australia) Wally Masur (quarterfinals)

== Draw ==
Key

- Q = Qualifier
- WC = Wild card
- LL = Lucky loser
- Alt = Alternate
- ITF = ITF entry
- PR = Protected ranking
- SR = Special ranking
- SE = Special exempt
- JE = Junior exempt
- JR = Junior Accelerator Programme entrant
- CO = College Accelerator Programme entrant
- NG = Next Gen Accelerator Program entrant
- w/o = Walkover
- r = Retired
- d = Defaulted

=== Finals ===
Semifinals
1	(Australia) John Fitzgerald (Sweden) Anders Järryd	6	6
6	(United States) Kevin Curren (South Africa) Gary Muller	4	2
3	(United States) Kelly Jones (United States) Rick Leach	6	3	6
2	(Canada) Grant Connell (Canada) Glenn Michibata	3	6	1

Final
1	(Australia) John Fitzgerald (Sweden) Anders Järryd	6	5	3
3	(United States) Kelly Jones (United States) Rick Leach	0	7	6

=== Top half ===
First round
(Germany) P Kühnen (Germany) A Mronz	6	6
(Italy) U Colombini (Ukraine) D Poliakov	3	4
(United States) T Nelson (United States) B Pearce	6	6	7
Q	(Germany) A Thoms (Germany) M Zoecke	7	4	6
(United States) T Ho (Japan) S Kanroji	1	2
8	(Australia) M Kratzmann (Australia) W Masur	6	6
(Netherlands) P Haarhuis (Netherlands) M Schapers	1	5
(Australia) N Borwick (Australia) S Youl	6	7
(Japan) E Furusho (Japan) T Sato	2	2
(Zimbabwe) B Black (South Africa) B Talbot	6	6
Q	(Canada) D Nestor (Germany) C Saceanu	6	6	6
6	(United States) K Curren (South Africa) G Muller	3	7	7

Second round
1	(Australia) J Fitzgerald (Sweden) A Järryd	6	6
(Germany) P Kühnen (Germany) A Mronz	4	3
(United States) T Nelson (United States) B Pearce	7	6	2
8	(Australia) M Kratzmann (Australia) W Masur	6	7	6
4	(United States) J Grabb (United States) D Pate	6	6
(Australia) N Borwick (Australia) S Youl	4	2
(Zimbabwe) B Black (South Africa) B Talbot	4	6
6	(United States) K Curren (South Africa) G Muller	6	7

Quarterfinals
1	(Australia) J Fitzgerald (Sweden) A Järryd	6	6
8	(Australia) M Kratzmann (Australia) W Masur	3	1
4	(United States) J Grabb (United States) D Pate	3	4
6	(United States) K Curren (South Africa) G Muller	6	6

Semifinals
1	(Australia) J Fitzgerald (Sweden) A Järryd	6	6
6	(United States) K Curren (South Africa) G Muller	4	2

=== Bottom half ===
First round
5	(United States) K Kinnear (United States) S Salumaa	2	6	6
(United Kingdom) J Bates (United Kingdom) N Broad	6	4	3
(Japan) H Nakano (Japan) R Tsujino	3	6	3
(Sweden) H Holm (Italy) G Pozzi	6	4	6
(New Zealand) K Evernden (New Zealand) B Steven	4	3
(United States) B Gilbert (Israel) A Mansdorf	6	6
7	(Sweden) S Edberg (Australia) T Woodbridge	6	6
(Mexico) L Lavalle (Brazil) D Marcelino	3	4
(Japan) S Matsuoka (Netherlands) J Siemerink	7	4	3
(Czechoslovakia) M Damm (Australia) S Stolle	6	6	6
(Austria) A Antonitsch (United States) D Eisenman	6	4
(Australia) B Dyke (Nigeria) N Odizor	7	6

Second round
5	(United States) K Kinnear (United States) S Salumaa	6	4	4
(Sweden) H Holm (Italy) G Pozzi	4	6	6
(United States) B Gilbert (Israel) A Mansdorf	2	2
3	(United States) K Jones (United States) R Leach	6	6
7	(Sweden) S Edberg (Australia) T Woodbridge	6	6
(Czechoslovakia) M Damm (Australia) S Stolle	0	3
(Australia) B Dyke (Nigeria) N Odizor	4	2
2	(Canada) G Connell (Canada) G Michibata	6	6

Quarterfinals
(Sweden) H Holm (Italy) G Pozzi	1	7	4
3	(United States) K Jones (United States) R Leach	6	6	6
7	(Sweden) S Edberg (Australia) T Woodbridge	5	4
2	(Canada) G Connell (Canada) G Michibata	7	6

Semifinals
3	(United States) K Jones (United States) R Leach	6	3	6
2	(Canada) G Connell (Canada) G Michibata	3	6	1
