= 1992 Suntory Japan Open Tennis Championships =

- Date: 6–12 April
- Edition: 19th
- Category: Championship Series (ATP); Tier IV (WTA)
- Surface: Hard / outdoor
- Location: Tokyo, Japan
- Venue: Ariake Coliseum

Champions

Men's singles
- (United States) Jim Courier

Women's singles
- (Japan) Kimiko Date

Men's doubles
- (United States) Kelly Jones / (United States) Rick Leach

Women's doubles
- (United States) Amy Frazier / (Japan) Rika Hiraki
- Japan Open

The 1992 Suntory Japan Open Tennis Championships was a combined men's and women's tennis tournament played on outdoor hardcourts at the Ariake Coliseum in Tokyo, Japan that was part of the Championship Series of the 1992 ATP Tour and of Tier IV of the 1992 WTA Tour. The tournament was held from 6 to 12 April 1992. Jim Courier and Kimiko Date won the singles titles.

== Finals ==
=== Men's singles ===
(United States) Jim Courier def. (Netherlands) Richard Krajicek, 6–4, 6–4, 7–6^{(7–3)}

- It was Courier's 2nd title of the year and the 6th of his career.

=== Women's singles ===
(Japan) Kimiko Date def. (Belgium) Sabine Appelmans, 7–5, 3–6, 6–3

- It was Date's 1st title of her career.

=== Men's doubles ===
(United States) Kelly Jones / (United States) Rick Leach def. (Australia) John Fitzgerald / (Sweden) Anders Järryd, 0–6, 7–5, 6–3

=== Women's doubles ===
(United States) Amy Frazier / (Japan) Rika Hiraki def. (Japan) Kimiko Date / (United States) Stephanie Rehe, 5–7, 7–6^{(7–5)}, 6–0
