= Slimane Saoudi =

Algerian tennis player

- Country (sports): France; Algeria
- Born: 23 July 1975 (age 50)
- Turned pro: 1993
- Retired: 2008
- Plays: Left-handed
- Prize money: $161,196

Singles
- Career record: 7–12
- Career titles: 0
- Highest ranking: No. 212 (21 July 2003)

Grand Slam singles results
- US Open: 1R (2002)

Doubles
- Career record: 3–5
- Career titles: 0
- Highest ranking: No. 422 (28 August 2006)
Medal record
Men's Tennis
Representing Algeria
Mediterranean Games
Silver medal – second place	2005 Almería	Doubles
All-Africa Games
Gold medal – first place	2007 Algiers	Doubles
Gold medal – first place	2007 Algiers	Team Event
Islamic Solidarity Games
Silver medal – second place	2005 Ta'if	Team Event
Bronze medal – third place	2005 Ta'if	Singles
Bronze medal – third place	2005 Ta'if	Doubles
Representing France
Universiade
Bronze medal – third place	1999 Palma	Singles
Bronze medal – third place	1999 Palma	Doubles

Slimane Saoudi (Arabic: سليمان سعودي) (born 23 July 1975) is a former professional Algerian tennis player.

Saoudi reached his highest individual ranking on the ATP Tour on 21 July 2003, when he became World No. 212. His only appearance at a Grand Slam came at the 2002 U.S. Open, where he reached the main draw as a qualifier, losing in the first round in five sets to fellow qualifier Ivo Heuberger of Switzerland. He played primarily on the Futures circuit.

Saoudi was a member of the Algeria Davis Cup team until 2009, posting a 5–11 record in singles and a 3–6 record in doubles. He first played Davis Cup only in 2005.

== Career titles ==
Legend (singles)
Grand Slam (0)
Tennis Masters Cup (0)
ATP Masters Series (0)
ATP Tour (0)
Challengers (0)
Futures (10)

No.	Date	Tournament	Surface	Opponent in the final	Score
1.	1999	Aix-les-Bains	Hard (i)	(France) Julien Cuaz	7–5, 7–6
2.	2001	Bourg-en-Bresse	Clay	(France) Florent Serra	6–2, 7–6
3.	2001	Aix-en-Provence	Clay	(France) Julien Benneteau	6–4, 3–6, 6–0
4.	2002	Trier	Clay	(Czech Republic) Petr Kralert	6–2, 6–4
5.	2002	Zell	Clay	(Poland) Łukasz Kubot	7–5, 6–3
6.	2005	Doha	Hard	(Russia) Philipp Mukhometov	6–2, 6–2
7.	2005	Irun	Clay	(France) Augustin Gensse	6–4, 6–7, 6–3
8.	2005	Algiers	Clay	(Algeria) Lamine Ouahab	6–4, 3–6, 6–2
9.	2005	Feucherolles	Hard (i)	(Tunisia) Malek Jaziri	5–7, 7–6, 6–3
10.	2007	Irun	Clay	(Spain) Carlos Rexach-Itoiz	7–6, 6–4
