= Daiji Morii =

Japanese tennis player (born 1967)

- Country (sports): Japan
- Born: 4 August 1967 (age 58)

Singles
- Highest ranking: No. 446 (29 Nov 1993)

Grand Slam singles results
- Australian Open: Q1 (1993, 1995)
- Wimbledon: Q1 (1994)

Doubles
- Career record: 0–1
- Highest ranking: No. 738 (9 Aug 1993)

Daiji Morii (born 4 August 1967) is a Japanese former professional tennis player.

Morii reached a best singles ranking of 446 on the professional tour, which included a qualifying draw appearance at the Wimbledon Championships. He was a singles quarter-finalist at the Réunion Island Challenger in 1993, with wins over Éric Winogradsky and Mark Kaplan. His only ATP Tour main draw came in doubles at the 1996 Japan Open.
