= 1992 Suntory Japan Open Tennis Championships – Men's singles =

Men's singles
- 1992 Suntory Japan Open Tennis Championships

Final
- Champion: (United States) Jim Courier
- Runner-up: (Netherlands) Richard Krajicek
- Score: 6–4, 6–4, 7–6^{(7–3)}

Details
- Draw: 56 (7Q / 5WC)
- Seeds: 16

Events
Singles	men	women
Doubles	men	women
- Japan Open

First-seeded Stefan Edberg was the defending champion, but lost in the semifinals to Richard Krajicek.

Jim Courier won in the final 6–4, 6–4, 7–6^{(7–3)} against Krajicek.

== Seeds ==
The top eight seeds received a bye into the second round.

1. (Sweden) Stefan Edberg (semifinals)
2. (United States) Jim Courier (champion)
3. (Germany) Michael Stich (quarterfinals)
4. (United States) Michael Chang (semifinals)
5. (United States) Derrick Rostagno (second round, retired)
6. (Netherlands) Richard Krajicek (final)
7. (United States) Brad Gilbert (quarterfinals)
8. (Israel) Amos Mansdorf (quarterfinals)
9. (United States) Aaron Krickstein (third round)
10. (Netherlands) Paul Haarhuis (third round)
11. (United States) Jimmy Connors (second round)
12. (Netherlands) Jan Siemerink (second round)
13. (Germany) Markus Zoecke (third round)
14. (Sweden) Anders Järryd (third round)
15. (Australia) Wally Masur (third round)
16. (Italy) Gianluca Pozzi (third round)

== Draw ==
Key

- Q = Qualifier
- WC = Wild card
- LL = Lucky loser
- Alt = Alternate
- ITF = ITF entry
- PR = Protected ranking
- SR = Special ranking
- SE = Special exempt
- JE = Junior exempt
- JR = Junior Accelerator Programme entrant
- CO = College Accelerator Programme entrant
- NG = Next Gen Accelerator Program entrant
- w/o = Walkover
- r = Retired
- d = Defaulted

=== Finals ===
Quarterfinals
1	(Sweden) Stefan Edberg	4	6	6
7	(United States) Brad Gilbert	6	2	3
3	(Germany) Michael Stich	6^{5}	4
6	(Netherlands) Richard Krajicek	7^{7}	6
(Australia) Todd Woodbridge	4	6	0
4	(United States) Michael Chang	6	1	6
8	(Israel) Amos Mansdorf	6^{5}	4
2	(United States) Jim Courier	7^{7}	6

Semifinals
1	(Sweden) Stefan Edberg	3	5
6	(Netherlands) Richard Krajicek	6	7
4	(United States) Michael Chang	2	3
2	(United States) Jim Courier	6	6

Final
6	(Netherlands) Richard Krajicek	4	4	6^{3}
2	(United States) Jim Courier	6	6	7^{7}

=== Top half ===
==== Section 1 ====
First round
(New Zealand) K Evernden	7^{7}	6
(Germany) C Saceanu	6^{5}	3
(Brazil) D Marcelino	1	1
(Australia) J Fitzgerald	6	6
Q	(United States) D Pate	4	3
15	(Australia) W Masur	6	6
9	(United States) A Krickstein	6	6
(Sweden) H Holm	3	2
(Australia) S Youl	6	3	7^{7}
Q	(Australia) M Kratzmann	1	6	6^{2}
(Mexico) L Lavalle	1	7	4
(Canada) C Pridham	6	5	6

Second round
1	(Sweden) S Edberg	6	6
(New Zealand) K Evernden	3	4
(Australia) J Fitzgerald	4	2
15	(Australia) W Masur	6	6
9	(United States) A Krickstein	6	7^{7}
(Australia) S Youl	1	6^{0}
(Canada) C Pridham	3	0
7	(United States) B Gilbert	6	6

Third round
1	(Sweden) S Edberg	6	6
15	(Australia) W Masur	3	4
9	(United States) A Krickstein	4	6	2
7	(United States) B Gilbert	6	3	6

Quarterfinals
1	(Sweden) S Edberg	4	6	6
7	(United States) B Gilbert	6	2	3

==== Section 2 ====
First round
Q	(Germany) B Karbacher	2	6	3
(Japan) S Matsuoka	6	3	6
(Ukraine) D Poliakov	2	5
(Czechoslovakia) M Damm	6	7
(Australia) P Cash	1	6	1
14	(Sweden) A Järryd	6	2	6
12	(Netherlands) J Siemerink	6	6
WC	(Japan) T Tsuchihashi	0	3
(United States) C Adams	7^{7}	4	4
(United States) J Grabb	6^{5}	6	6
(Germany) A Thoms	6	2	6
(Germany) A Mronz	4	6	2

Second round
3	(Germany) M Stich	7^{7}	3	7^{9}
(Japan) S Matsuoka	6^{5}	6	6^{7}
(Czechoslovakia) M Damm	3	1
14	(Sweden) A Järryd	6	6
12	(Netherlands) J Siemerink	7^{9}	5	1
(United States) J Grabb	6^{7}	7	6
(Germany) A Thoms	3	6^{5}
6	(Netherlands) R Krajicek	6	7^{7}

Third round
3	(Germany) M Stich	7	6
14	(Sweden) A Järryd	5	2
(United States) J Grabb	4	3
6	(Netherlands) R Krajicek	6	6

Quarterfinals
3	(Germany) M Stich	6^{5}	4
6	(Netherlands) R Krajicek	7^{7}	6

=== Bottom half ===
==== Section 3 ====
First round
Q	(New Zealand) B Steven	6^{3}	6	7^{7}
WC	(Japan) R Tsujino	7^{7}	4	6^{3}
(Australia) T Woodbridge	6	4	6
(France) G Raoux	3	6	4
(Zimbabwe) B Black	6^{5}	3
11/WC	(United States) J Connors	7^{7}	6
13	(Germany) M Zoecke	6	7^{7}
(Australia) S Stolle	4	6^{3}
Q	(United States) K Jones	6	6
WC	(Japan) H Tanizawa	4	2
WC	(Japan) K Masuda	1	2
(United States) S Bryan	6	6

Second round
5	(United States) D Rostagno	2	1^{r}
Q	(New Zealand) B Steven	6	2
(Australia) T Woodbridge	6	6
11/WC	(United States) J Connors	0	1
13	(Germany) M Zoecke	4	6	6
Q	(United States) K Jones	6	3	2
(United States) S Bryan	3	2
4	(United States) M Chang	6	6

Third round
Q	(New Zealand) B Steven	6	3	4
(Australia) T Woodbridge	4	6	6
13	(Germany) M Zoecke	4	2
4	(United States) M Chang	6	6

Quarterfinals
(Australia) T Woodbridge	4	6	0
4	(United States) M Chang	6	1	6

==== Section 4 ====
First round
(Canada) M Laurendeau	4	6	7^{7}
(Germany) P Kühnen	6	2	6^{4}
Q	(United States) B Pearce	4	6	1
(Netherlands) M Schapers	6	3	6
(Austria) A Antonitsch	3	3
10	(Netherlands) P Haarhuis	6	6
16	(Italy) G Pozzi	4	7^{7}	6
(France) J-P Fleurian	6	6^{5}	3
(Canada) G Connell	6	6
Q	(United Kingdom) M Petchey	4	2
(South Africa) G Muller	5	4
(United States) K Curren	7	6

Second round
8	(Israel) A Mansdorf	6	6
(Canada) M Laurendeau	4	1
(Netherlands) M Schapers	6	5	3
10	(Netherlands) P Haarhuis	3	7	6
16	(Italy) G Pozzi	7^{7}	6^{5}	6
(Canada) G Connell	6^{4}	7^{7}	3
(United States) K Curren	1	1
2	(United States) J Courier	6	6

Third round
8	(Israel) A Mansdorf	4	6	7^{7}
10	(Netherlands) P Haarhuis	6	1	6^{1}
16	(Italy) G Pozzi	3	3
2	(United States) J Courier	6	6

Quarterfinals
8	(Israel) A Mansdorf	6^{5}	4
2	(United States) J Courier	7^{7}	6
