= Kotaro Miyachi =

Japanese tennis player (born 1974)

- Country (sports): Japan
- Born: 18 February 1974 (age 51); Fukuyama, Hiroshima, Japan
- Prize money: $44,690

Singles
- Career record: 4–4
- Highest ranking: No. 303 (27 July 1998)

Grand Slam singles results
- Australian Open: Q3 (1999)
Medal record
Universiade
Bronze medal – third place	1995 Fukuoka	Singles

Kotaro Miyachi (Japanese: 宮地 弘太郎, born 18 February 1974) is a Japanese former professional tennis player.

Born in Fukuyama, Miyachi was a World Youth Cup (Junior Davis Cup) representative for Japan in 1990, securing a win over future world number one Marcelo Ríos.

While competing on the professional tour, Miyachi reached a career high singles ranking of 303 in the world. He participated in the qualifying draw of the Australian Open on three occasions. His best performance on the ATP Tour came at the 1995 Japan Open, where he had wins over David Pate and Stephen Noteboom, to make the round of 16.

Miyachi was a singles bronze medalist at the 1995 Summer Universiade.
