= 1996 Japan Open Tennis Championships =

- Date: April 15–21
- Edition: 23rd
- Prize money: $935,000 (men) $164,250 (women)
- Surface: Hard / outdoor
- Location: Tokyo, Japan
- Venue: Ariake Coliseum

Champions

Men's singles
- (United States) Pete Sampras

Women's singles
- (Japan) Kimiko Date

Men's doubles
- (Australia) Todd Woodbridge / (Australia) Mark Woodforde

Women's doubles
- (Japan) Kimiko Date / (Japan) Ai Sugiyama
- Japan Open

The 1996 Japan Open Tennis Championships was a combined men's and women's tennis tournament played on outdoor hard courts at the Ariake Coliseum in Tokyo in Japan that was part of the Championship Series of the 1996 ATP Tour and of Tier III of the 1996 WTA Tour. The tournament ran from April 15 through April 21, 1996. Pete Sampras and Kimiko Date won the singles titles.

== Finals ==
=== Men's singles ===
(United States) Pete Sampras defeated (United States) Richey Reneberg 6–4, 7–5

- It was Sampras' 4th singles title of the year and the 40th of his career.

=== Women's singles ===
(Japan) Kimiko Date defeated (United States) Amy Frazier 7–5, 6–4

- It was Date's 1st singles title of the year and the 6th of her career.

=== Men's doubles ===
(Australia) Todd Woodbridge / (Australia) Mark Woodforde defeated (The Bahamas) Mark Knowles / (United States) Rick Leach 6–2, 6–3

- It was Woodbridge's 5th title of the year and the 45th of his career. It was Woodforde's 6th title of the year and the 49th of his career.

=== Women's doubles ===
(Japan) Kimiko Date / (Japan) Ai Sugiyama defeated (United States) Amy Frazier / (United States) Kimberly Po 7–6, 6–7, 6–3

- It was Date's 2nd title of the year and the 7th of her career. It was Sugiyama's only title of the year and the 3rd of her career.
