= 1992 Suntory Japan Open Tennis Championships – Women's doubles =

Women's doubles
- 1992 Suntory Japan Open Tennis Championships

Final
- Champion: (United States) Amy Frazier; (Japan) Rika Hiraki
- Runner-up: (Japan) Kimiko Date; (United States) Stephanie Rehe
- Score: 5–7, 7–6^{(7–5)}, 6–0

Details
- Draw: 16 (1Q / 1WC)
- Seeds: 4

Events
Singles	men	women
Doubles	men	women
- Japan Open

Amy Frazier and Maya Kidowaki were the defending champions, but competed this year with different partners. Kidowaki teamed up with Sabine Appelmans and lost in the first round to Pascale Paradis and Sandrine Testud.

Frazier teamed up with Rika Hiraki and won the title, defeating Kimiko Date and Stephanie Rehe in the final, 5–7, 7–6^{(7–5)}, 6–0.

== Seeds ==
1. (Japan) Kimiko Date / (United States) Stephanie Rehe (final)
2. (Belgium) Sabine Appelmans / (Japan) Maya Kidowaki (first round)
3. (Germany) Claudia Porwik / (Italy) Raffaella Reggi (semifinals)
4. (France) Isabelle Demongeot / (Ukraine) Natalia Medvedeva (semifinals)

== Draw ==
Key

- Q = Qualifier
- WC = Wild card
- LL = Lucky loser
- Alt = Alternate
- ITF = ITF entry
- PR = Protected ranking
- SR = Special ranking
- SE = Special exempt
- JE = Junior exempt
- JR = Junior Accelerator Programme entrant
- CO = College Accelerator Programme entrant
- NG = Next Gen Accelerator Program entrant
- w/o = Walkover
- r = Retired
- d = Defaulted

First round
1	(Japan) K Date (United States) S Rehe	3	6	6
(Australia) M Jaggard-Lai (France) C Suire	6	3	4
(United States) A Henricksson (United States) M Werdel	1	4
(Australia) L Field (United Kingdom) C Wood	6	6
4	(France) I Demongeot (Ukraine) N Medvedeva	3	6	7
(Japan) A Kijimuta (Japan) N Sawamatsu	6	2	5
(Indonesia) Y Basuki (Japan) N Smith	6	6
(Czechoslovakia) P Langrová (Czechoslovakia) E Švíglerová	0	4
Q	(France) A Fusai (France) N Van Lottum	2	4
(Japan) E Iida (Australia) K Kunce	6	6
WC	(Japan) A Hirose (Japan) Y Kamio	3	2
3	(Germany) C Porwik (Italy) R Reggi	6	6
(United States) A Frazier (Japan) R Hiraki	1	6	7^{8}
(United States) A May (United States) K Po	6	1	6^{6}
(France) P Paradis (France) S Testud	6	4	7^{7}
2	(Belgium) S Appelmans (Japan) M Kidowaki	4	6	6^{5}

Quarterfinals
1	(Japan) K Date (United States) S Rehe	7^{7}	3	6
(Australia) L Field (United Kingdom) C Wood	6^{3}	6	2
4	(France) I Demongeot (Ukraine) N Medvedeva	4	6	6
(Indonesia) Y Basuki (Japan) N Smith	6	4	4
(Japan) E Iida (Australia) K Kunce	6	3	3
3	(Germany) C Porwik (Italy) R Reggi	4	6	6
(United States) A Frazier (Japan) R Hiraki	6	6
(France) P Paradis (France) S Testud	3	2

Semifinals
1	(Japan) K Date (United States) S Rehe	6	6
4	(France) I Demongeot (Ukraine) N Medvedeva	4	4
3	(Germany) C Porwik (Italy) R Reggi	2	6^{3}
(United States) A Frazier (Japan) R Hiraki	6	7^{7}

Final
1	(Japan) K Date (United States) S Rehe	7	6^{5}	0
(United States) A Frazier (Japan) R Hiraki	5	7^{7}	6
