= 1996 Japan Open Tennis Championships – Women's singles =

Women's singles
- 1996 Japan Open Tennis Championships

Final
- Champion: (Japan) Kimiko Date
- Runner-up: (United States) Amy Frazier
- Score: 7–5, 6–4

Details
- Draw: 32 (4 Q / 2 WC )
- Seeds: 8

Events
Singles	men	women
Doubles	men	women
← 1995 ·	Japan Open	· 1997 →

The 1996 Japan Open Tennis Championships included this tournament in women's singles. Third-seeded Amy Frazier was the defending champion but lost in the final 7–5, 6–4 against first-seeded Kimiko Date.

== Seeds ==
A champion seed is indicated in bold text while text in italics indicates the round in which that seed was eliminated.

1. (Japan) **Kimiko Date (champion)**
2. (Belgium) Sabine Appelmans (first round)
3. (United States) Amy Frazier (final)
4. (Japan) Ai Sugiyama (semifinals)
5. (Japan) Naoko Sawamatsu (second round)
6. (Chinese Taipei) Shi-Ting Wang (first round)
7. (Japan) Yone Kamio (first round)
8. (United States) Marianne Witmeyer (second round)

== Draw ==
=== Key ===
- Q = Qualifier
- WC = Wild card
- LL = Lucky loser
- Alt = Alternate
- ITF = ITF entry
- PR = Protected ranking
- SR = Special ranking
- SE = Special exempt
- JE = Junior exempt
- JR = Junior Accelerator Programme entrant
- CO = College Accelerator Programme entrant
- NG = Next Gen Accelerator Program entrant
- w/o = Walkover
- r = Retired
- d = Defaulted

First round
1	(Japan) **K Date**	**6**	**6**
(Japan) R Hiraki	3	1
(South Korea) S-H Park	2	3
(United States) **A Grossman**	**6**	**6**
(Japan) K Nagatsuka	6	4
(Finland) **N Dahlman**	**7**	**6**
(Germany) **K Kschwendt**	**6**	**6**
6	(Chinese Taipei) S-T Wang	2	2
4	(Japan) **A Sugiyama**	**6**	**6**
LL	(Hong Kong) M Tang	1	4
(Japan) **M Endo**	**7**	**6**
(France) N Dechy	5	4
(Slovakia) **K Studeníková**	**6**	**6**
WC	(Japan) M Saeki	3	0
(Belgium) **L Courtois**	3	**7**	**6**
7	(Japan) Y Kamio	**6**	5	3
8	(United States) **M Witmeyer**	**6**	**6**
Q	(Australia) A Ellwood	3	4
(United States) L Wild	6	**6**	2
Q	(United States) **K Po**	**7**	4	**6**
WC	(Japan) **Y Yoshida**	5	**6**	**6**
(Belgium) N Feber	**7**	4	2
Q	(Japan) K Takuma	2	3
3	(United States) **A Frazier**	**6**	**6**
5	(Japan) **N Sawamatsu**	**7**	**6**
(United States) L Poruri	5	3
Q	(United States) **C Morariu**	**6**	4	**6**
(Netherlands) S Rottier	4	**6**	2
(Netherlands) P Kamstra	0	2
(Japan) **N Kijimuta**	**6**	**6**
(Japan) **N Miyagi**	**7**	4	**6**
2	(Belgium) S Appelmans	6	**6**	0

Second round
1	(Japan) **K Date**	**7**	**6**
(United States) A Grossman	5	4
(Finland) N Dahlman	4	4
(Germany) **K Kschwendt**	**6**	**6**
4	(Japan) **A Sugiyama**	**6**	3	**7**
(Japan) M Endo	3	**6**	5
(Slovakia) **K Studeníková**	**6**	**6**
(Belgium) L Courtois	4	2
8	(United States) M Witmeyer	2	2
Q	(United States) **K Po**	**6**	**6**
WC	(Japan) Y Yoshida	1	1
3	(United States) **A Frazier**	**6**	**6**
6	(Japan) N Sawamatsu	**7**	3	6
Q	(United States) **C Morariu**	5	**6**	**7**
(Japan) **N Kijimuta**	2	**6**	**6**
(Japan) N Miyagi	**6**	4	2

Quarterfinals
1	(Japan) **K Date**	**6**	**6**
(Germany) K Kschwendt	2	2
4	(Japan) **A Sugiyama**	**5**
(Slovakia) K Studeníková	0	r
Q	(United States) K Po	3	0
3	(United States) **A Frazier**	**6**	**6**
Q	(United States) C Morariu	3	3
(Japan) **N Kijimuta**	**6**	**6**

Semifinals
1	(Japan) **K Date**	**6**	**6**
4	(Japan) A Sugiyama	1	3
3	(United States) **A Frazier**	**6**	6	**6**
(Japan) N Kijimuta	3	**7**	1

Final
1	(Japan) **Kimiko Date**	**7**	**6**
3	(United States) Amy Frazier	5	4
