= 1992 Suntory Japan Open Tennis Championships – Women's singles =

Women's singles
- 1992 Suntory Japan Open Tennis Championships

Final
- Champion: (Japan) Kimiko Date
- Runner-up: (Belgium) Sabine Appelmans
- Score: 7–5, 3–6, 6–3

Details
- Draw: 32 (4Q / 2WC)
- Seeds: 8

Events
Singles	men	women
Doubles	men	women
- Japan Open

Lori McNeil was the defending champion, but did not participate this year.

Kimiko Date won the title, defeating Sabine Appelmans in the final, 7–5, 3–6, 6–3.

== Seeds ==
1. (United States) Amy Frazier (semifinals)
2. (Belgium) Sabine Appelmans (final)
3. (Japan) Kimiko Date (champion)
4. (Japan) Naoko Sawamatsu (semifinals)
5. (Ukraine) Natalia Medvedeva (quarterfinals)
6. (Indonesia) Yayuk Basuki (first round)
7. (Sweden) Catarina Lindqvist (second round)
8. (United States) Marianne Werdel (quarterfinals)

== Draw ==
Key

- Q = Qualifier
- WC = Wild card
- LL = Lucky loser
- Alt = Alternate
- ITF = ITF entry
- PR = Protected ranking
- SR = Special ranking
- SE = Special exempt
- JE = Junior exempt
- JR = Junior Accelerator Programme entrant
- CO = College Accelerator Programme entrant
- NG = Next Gen Accelerator Program entrant
- w/o = Walkover
- r = Retired
- d = Defaulted

=== Finals ===
Semifinals
1	(United States) Amy Frazier	3	4
3	(Japan) Kimiko Date	6	6
4	(Japan) Naoko Sawamatsu	6^{6}	3
2	(Belgium) Sabine Appelmans	7^{8}	6

Final
3	(Japan) Kimiko Date	7	3	6
2	(Belgium) Sabine Appelmans	5	6	3

=== Top half ===
First round
1	(United States) A Frazier	6	6
(United States) K Po	2	4
Q	(United States) S Rehe	6	6
Q	(United States) A Henricksson	2	3
(Germany) C Porwik	6	2	3
(Japan) R Hiraki	4	6	6
(France) P Paradis	2	7^{8}	5
5	(Ukraine) N Medvedeva	6	6^{6}	7
3	(Japan) K Date	5	6	6
(Czechoslovakia) P Langrová	7	0	1
(Australia) J Byrne	3	2
(Japan) M Endo	6	6
(United Kingdom) M Javer	6	6
(Belgium) D Monami	1	4
(Japan) K Nagatsuka	4	2
7	(Sweden) C Lindqvist	6	6

Second round
1	(United States) A Frazier	6	6
Q	(United States) S Rehe	1	2
(Japan) R Hiraki	3	1
5	(Ukraine) N Medvedeva	6	6
3	(Japan) K Date	6	6
(Japan) M Endo	4	4
(United Kingdom) M Javer	6	7
7	(Sweden) C Lindqvist	4	5

Quarterfinals
1	(United States) A Frazier	6	6
5	(Ukraine) N Medvedeva	4	1
3	(Japan) K Date	6	6
(United Kingdom) M Javer	4	1

Semifinals
1	(United States) A Frazier	3	4
3	(Japan) K Date	6	6

=== Bottom half ===
First round
6	(Indonesia) Y Basuki	4	3
Q	(Chinese Taipei) S Wang	6	6
(Italy) R Reggi	6	6
(Czechoslovakia) E Švíglerová	1	3
(France) I Demongeot	6	6
(France) C Suire	4	0
(Japan) A Kijimuta	3	7	2
4	(Japan) N Sawamatsu	6	5	6
8	(United States) M Werdel	7	7^{7}
Q	(China) F Li	5	6^{5}
(France) S Testud	0	7^{8}	7^{7}
WC	(Japan) A Sugiyama	6	6^{6}	6^{3}
WC	(Japan) Y Kamio	6^{6}	6	6
(Japan) M Kidowaki	7^{8}	3	1
(France) N Van Lottum	3	4
2	(Belgium) S Appelmans	6	6

Second round
Q	(Chinese Taipei) S Wang	2	0
(Italy) R Reggi	6	6
(France) I Demongeot	2	4
4	(Japan) N Sawamatsu	6	6
8	(United States) M Werdel	6	3	6
(France) S Testud	0	6	2
WC	(Japan) Y Kamio	1	2
2	(Belgium) S Appelmans	6	6

Quarterfinals
(Italy) R Reggi	3	2
4	(Japan) N Sawamatsu	6	6
8	(United States) M Werdel	5	2
2	(Belgium) S Appelmans	7	6

Semifinals
4	(Japan) N Sawamatsu	6^{6}	3
2	(Belgium) S Appelmans	7^{8}	6
