= 1995 Japan Open Tennis Championships – Women's singles =

Women's singles
- 1995 Japan Open Tennis Championships

Final
- Champion: (United States) Amy Frazier
- Runner-up: (Japan) Kimiko Date
- Score: 7–6^{(7–5)}, 7–5

Details
- Draw: 32 (4 Q / 2 WC )
- Seeds: 8

Events
Singles	men	women
Doubles	men	women
← 1994 ·	Japan Open	· 1996 →

Kimiko Date was the defending champion but lost in the final 7–6^{(7–5)}, 7–5 against Amy Frazier.

== Seeds ==
A champion seed is indicated in bold text while text in italics indicates the round in which that seed was eliminated.

1. (Japan) Kimiko Date (final)
2. (United States) **Amy Frazier (champion)**
3. (United States) Marianne Werdel-Witmeyer (second round)
4. (Japan) Mana Endo (second round)
5. (Japan) Kyōko Nagatsuka (quarterfinals)
6. (Japan) Yone Kamio (quarterfinals)
7. (United States) Patty Fendick (quarterfinals)
8. (Japan) Nana Miyagi (semifinals)

== Draw ==
=== Key ===
- Q = Qualifier
- WC = Wild card
- LL = Lucky loser
- Alt = Alternate
- ITF = ITF entry
- PR = Protected ranking
- SR = Special ranking
- SE = Special exempt
- JE = Junior exempt
- JR = Junior Accelerator Programme entrant
- CO = College Accelerator Programme entrant
- NG = Next Gen Accelerator Program entrant
- w/o = Walkover
- r = Retired
- d = Defaulted

First round
1	(Japan) **K Date**	**6**	**6**
WC	(Japan) Y Yoshida	2	4
(France) N van Lottum	4	4
(Australia) **R Stubbs**	**6**	**6**
(South Korea) **S-H Park**	**6**	**7**
(Japan) H Nagano	4	5
(Czech Republic) K Kroupová	1	1
5	(Japan) **K Nagatsuka**	**6**	**6**
3	(United States) **M Werdel-Witmeyer**	**6**	**6**
(Japan) A Sugiyama	3	4
(Italy) **R Grande**	1	**6**	**6**
(Australia) R McQuillan	**6**	3	3
Q	(China) **L-L Chen**	**6**	**6**
WC	(Japan) M Miyauchi	4	0
Q	(China) J-Q Yi	6^{6}	3
8	(Japan) **N Miyagi**	**7^{8}**	**6**
6	(Japan) **Y Kamio**	**6**	**6**
(Slovakia) J Husárová	3	2
(United States) **L Poruri**	**6**	**7**
LL	(Japan) M Saeki	2	5
Q	(United States) T Snyder	4	5
Q	(Hong Kong) **M Tang**	**6**	**7**
(Canada) M Drake	**6**	6^{3}	6^{4}
4	(Japan) **M Endo**	4	**7^{7}**	**7^{7}**
7	(United States) **P Fendick**	**6**	**6**
(Australia) A Ellwood	3	3
(United States) **J Watanabe**	5	**6**	**6**
(Germany) A Kerek	**7**	1	0
(Japan) **N Kijimuta**	**6**	**6**
(Australia) K Radford	0	4
(Japan) R Hiraki	1	2
2	(United States) **A Frazier**	**6**	**6**

Second round
1	(Japan) **K Date**	**6**	**6**
(Australia) R Stubbs	4	1
(South Korea) S-H Park	1	1
5	(Japan) **K Nagatsuka**	**6**	**6**
3	(United States) M Werdel-Witmeyer	2	4
(Italy) **R Grande**	**6**	**6**
Q	(China) L-L Chen	0	2
8	(Japan) **N Miyagi**	**6**	**6**
6	(Japan) **Y Kamio**	**6**	4	**6**
Q	(United States) L Poruri	2	**6**	3
Q	(Hong Kong) **M Tang**	4	**7^{7}**	**6**
4	(Japan) M Endo	**6**	6^{3}	3
7	(United States) **P Fendick**	**6**	**7**
(United States) J Watanabe	1	5
(Japan) N Kijimuta	1	3
2	(United States) **A Frazier**	**6**	**6**

Quarterfinals
1	(Japan) **K Date**	**6**	**6**
5	(Japan) K Nagatsuka	2	1
(Italy) R Grande	**6**	4	4
8	(Japan) **N Miyagi**	1	**6**	**6**
6	(Japan) Y Kamio	**6**	5	6^{3}
Q	(Hong Kong) **M Tang**	3	**7**	**7^{7}**
7	(United States) P Fendick	4	2
2	(United States) **A Frazier**	**6**	**6**

Semifinals
1	(Japan) **K Date**	**6**	**6**
8	(Japan) N Miyagi	1	2
Q	(Hong Kong) M Tang	3	3
2	(United States) **A Frazier**	**6**	**6**

Final
1	(Japan) Kimiko Date	6^{5}	5
2	(United States) **Amy Frazier**	**7^{7}**	**7**
