= 1996 Japan Open Tennis Championships – Women's doubles =

Women's doubles
- 1996 Japan Open Tennis Championships

Final
- Champions: (Japan) Kimiko Date (Japan) Ai Sugiyama
- Runners-up: (United States) Amy Frazier (United States) Kimberly Po
- Score: 7–6, 6–7, 6–3

Details
- Draw: 16
- Seeds: 4

Events
Singles	men	women
Doubles	men	women
← 1995 ·	Japan Open Tennis Championships	· 1997 →

The 1996 Japan Open Tennis Championships included this tournament in women's doubles. Miho Saeki and Yuka Yoshida were the defending champions but lost in the first round to Sung-Hee Park and Shi-Ting Wang.

Kimiko Date and Ai Sugiyama won in the final 7–6, 6–7, 6–3 against Amy Frazier and Kimberly Po.

== Seeds ==
Champion seeds are indicated in bold text while text in italics indicates the round in which those seeds were eliminated.

1. (Belgium) Sabine Appelmans / (Japan) Kyoko Nagatsuka (quarterfinals)
2. (United States) Amy Frazier / (United States) Kimberly Po (final)
3. (Belgium) Laurence Courtois / (Belgium) Nancy Feber (first round)
4. (Germany) Karin Kschwendt / (Canada) Rene Simpson (semifinals)

== Draw ==
=== Key ===
- Q = Qualifier
- WC = Wild card
- LL = Lucky loser
- Alt = Alternate
- ITF = ITF entry
- PR = Protected ranking
- SR = Special ranking
- SE = Special exempt
- JE = Junior exempt
- JR = Junior Accelerator Programme entrant
- CO = College Accelerator Programme entrant
- NG = Next Gen Accelerator Program entrant
- w/o = Walkover
- r = Retired
- d = Defaulted

First round
1	(Belgium) **S Appelmans** (Japan) **K Nagatsuka**	**6**	**6**
(Australia) A Ellwood (United States) C Morariu	1	2
WC	(Japan) **K Date** (Japan) **A Sugiyama**	**6**	**6**
Q	(Japan) Y Hosoki (Japan) Y Kitamura	2	0
4	(Germany) **K Kschwendt** (Canada) **R Simpson**	**w/o**
(Finland) N Dahlman (Slovakia) K Studeníková
(South Korea) **S-H Park** (Chinese Taipei) **S-T Wang**	**6**	**7**
(Japan) M Saeki (Japan) Y Yoshida	4	6
(United States) **A Grossman** (Japan) **N Miyagi**	**6**	**6**
(Japan) H Nagano (Japan) K Shibata	4	4
(Netherlands) **S Noorlander** (Netherlands) **S Rottier**	**w/o**
3	(Belgium) L Courtois (Belgium) N Feber
(Australia) C Barclay (Netherlands) P Kamstra	4	**7**	3
(Australia) **E Smylie** (United States) **L Wild**	**6**	6	**6**
(Japan) R Hiraki (Japan) N Kijimuta	6	5
2	(United States) **A Frazier** (United States) **K Po**	**7**	**7**

Quarterfinals
1	(Belgium) S Appelmans (Japan) K Nagatsuka	**6**	2	3
WC	(Japan) **K Date** (Japan) **A Sugiyama**	0	**6**	**6**
4	(Germany) **K Kschwendt** (Canada) **R Simpson**	**6**	**7**
(South Korea) S-H Park (Chinese Taipei) S-T Wang	3	5
(United States) **A Grossman** (Japan) **N Miyagi**	**6**	4	**6**
(Netherlands) S Noorlander (Netherlands) S Rottier	3	**6**	2
(Australia) E Smylie (United States) L Wild	4	2
2	(United States) **A Frazier** (United States) **K Po**	**6**	**6**

Semifinals
WC	(Japan) **K Date** (Japan) **A Sugiyama**	**6**	**7**
4	(Germany) K Kschwendt (Canada) R Simpson	1	6
(United States) A Grossman (Japan) N Miyagi	1	**6**	3
2	(United States) **A Frazier** (United States) **K Po**	**6**	4	**6**

Final
WC	(Japan) **Kimiko Date** (Japan) **Ai Sugiyama**	**7**	6	**6**
2	(United States) Amy Frazier (United States) Kimberly Po	6	**7**	3
