= 1995 Japan Open Tennis Championships =

- Date: 10–16 April
- Edition: 22nd
- Category: Championship Series (men); Tier III (women)
- Draw: 64S/32D (men); 32S/16D (women)
- Prize money: $935,000 (men) $161,250 (women)
- Surface: Hard / outdoor
- Location: Tokyo, Japan
- Venue: Ariake Coliseum

Champions

Men's singles
- (United States) Jim Courier

Women's singles
- (United States) Amy Frazier

Men's doubles
- (The Bahamas) Mark Knowles / (United States) Jonathan Stark

Women's doubles
- (Japan) Miho Saeki / (Japan) Yuka Yoshida
- Japan Open

The 1995 Japan Open Tennis Championships was a combined men's and women's tennis tournament played on outdoor hard courts at the Ariake Coliseum in Tokyo in Japan that was part of the Championship Series of the 1995 ATP Tour and of Tier III of the 1995 WTA Tour. It was the 22nd edition of the tournament and was held from 10 April through 16 April 1995. Jim Courier and Amy Frazier won the singles titles.

== Finals ==
=== Men's singles ===
(United States) Jim Courier defeated (United States) Andre Agassi 6–3, 6–4

- It was Courier's 4th title of the year and the 22nd of his career.

=== Women's singles ===
(United States) Amy Frazier defeated (Japan) Kimiko Date 7–6^{(7–5)}, 7–5

- It was Frazier's only title of the year and the 8th of her career.

=== Men's doubles ===
(The Bahamas) Mark Knowles / (United States) Jonathan Stark defeated (Australia) John Fitzgerald / (Sweden) Anders Järryd 6–3, 3–6, 7–6

- It was Knowles' 1st title of the year and the 3rd of his career. It was Stark's 2nd title of the year and the 14th of his career.

=== Women's doubles ===
(Japan) Miho Saeki / (Japan) Yuka Yoshida defeated (Japan) Kyōko Nagatsuka / (Japan) Ai Sugiyama 6–7^{(5–7)}, 6–4, 7–6^{(7–5)}

- It was Saeki's only title of the year and the 1st of her career. It was Yoshida's only title of the year and the 1st of her career.
