= Toshiaki Sakai =

Japanese tennis player (born 1974)

- Country (sports): Japan
- Born: 9 April 1974 (age 51); Tokyo, Japan
- Height: 5 ft 9 in (175 cm)
- Turned pro: 2002
- Retired: 2006
- Plays: Left-handed
- Prize money: $21,582

Singles
- Career record: 0–1
- Highest ranking: No. 468 (13 Sep 2004)

Grand Slam singles results
- Australian Open: Q1 (2003)

Doubles
- Career record: 0–1
- Highest ranking: No. 517 (14 Feb 2005)

Toshiaki Sakai (born 9 April 1974) is a Japanese former professional tennis player.

A left-handed player from Tokyo, Sakai made his only ATP Tour main draw appearances at the 1995 Japan Open, but didn't begin competing professionally until 2002.

Sakai, who is the son of Universiade champion Toshiro Sakai, was a student at Keio University and represented Japan at the 1995 Summer Universiade. He won the All Japan Student Tennis Championships singles title in 1996.

On the professional tour, Sakai reached a best singles ranking of 468 in the world and featured in the qualifying draw for the 2003 Australian Open. He had a best doubles world ranking of 517.
