= 2017 ITF Men's Circuit (April–June) =

The 2017 ITF Men's Circuit is the 2017 edition of the second-tier tour for men's professional tennis. It is organised by the International Tennis Federation and is a tier below the ATP Tour. The ITF Men's Circuit includes tournaments with prize money ranging from $15,000 up to $25,000.

== Key ==
$25,000 tournaments
$15,000 tournaments

== Month ==
=== April ===
Week of	Tournament	Winner	Runners-up	Semifinalists	Quarterfinalists
April 3	China F4 Futures; Luzhou, China; Hard $25,000; Singles and doubles draws	(China) Li Zhe; 6–3, 6–0	(Japan) Shuichi Sekiguchi	(Czech Republic) Jan Mertl (China) Zhong Suhao	(China) Xia Zihao (Poland) Andriej Kapaś (China) Te Rigele (Chinese Taipei) Jimmy Wang
April 3	China F4 Futures; Luzhou, China; Hard $25,000; Singles and doubles draws	(China) Gao Xin (China) Li Zhe; 4–6, 6–3, [10–6]	(Chinese Taipei) Peng Hsien-yin (Chinese Taipei) Jimmy Wang	(Czech Republic) Jan Mertl (China) Zhong Suhao	(China) Xia Zihao (Poland) Andriej Kapaś (China) Te Rigele (Chinese Taipei) Jimmy Wang
April 3	Italy F7 Futures; Pula, Italy; Clay $25,000; Singles and doubles draws	(Italy) Salvatore Caruso; 7–5, 6–3	(Argentina) Andrea Collarini	(Italy) Omar Giacalone (Austria) Michael Linzer	(Italy) Pietro Licciardi (Brazil) Guilherme Clezar (Argentina) Juan Pablo Paz (Italy) Lorenzo Giustino
April 3	Italy F7 Futures; Pula, Italy; Clay $25,000; Singles and doubles draws	(Netherlands) Mark Vervoort (United States) Rhyne Williams; 6–4, 6–4	(Switzerland) Adrian Bodmer (Germany) Jakob Sude	(Italy) Omar Giacalone (Austria) Michael Linzer	(Italy) Pietro Licciardi (Brazil) Guilherme Clezar (Argentina) Juan Pablo Paz (Italy) Lorenzo Giustino
April 3	Spain F10 Futures; Madrid, Spain; Clay $25,000; Singles and doubles draws	(Argentina) Pedro Cachin; 6–3, 6–3	(Russia) Ivan Gakhov	(Hungary) Attila Balázs (France) Maxime Hamou	(Spain) Bernabé Zapata Miralles (Spain) Jaime Fermosell (Spain) Javier Martí (Spain) Carlos Taberner
April 3	Spain F10 Futures; Madrid, Spain; Clay $25,000; Singles and doubles draws	(Spain) Carlos Boluda-Purkiss (Spain) Roberto Ortega Olmedo; 7–6^{(8–6)}, 6–3	(Spain) Carlos Gómez-Herrera (Spain) Juan Lizariturry	(Hungary) Attila Balázs (France) Maxime Hamou	(Spain) Bernabé Zapata Miralles (Spain) Jaime Fermosell (Spain) Javier Martí (Spain) Carlos Taberner
April 3	USA F12 Futures; Memphis, United States; Hard $25,000; Singles and doubles draws	(United States) Jared Hiltzik; 6–3, 6–3	(Zimbabwe) Takanyi Garanganga	(United States) Mackenzie McDonald (Canada) Philip Bester	(United States) Ryan Haviland (United States) Christian Harrison (Canada) Brayden Schnur (Germany) Jan Choinski
April 3	USA F12 Futures; Memphis, United States; Hard $25,000; Singles and doubles draws	(United Kingdom) Lloyd Glasspool (United States) Mackenzie McDonald; 6–2, 7–6^{(7–3)}	(Canada) Philip Bester (United States) Alex Lawson	(United States) Mackenzie McDonald (Canada) Philip Bester	(United States) Ryan Haviland (United States) Christian Harrison (Canada) Brayden Schnur (Germany) Jan Choinski
April 3	Egypt F12 Futures; Sharm El Sheikh, Egypt; Hard $15,000; Singles and doubles draws	(Canada) Filip Peliwo; 2–6, 6–3, 6–3	(Bosnia and Herzegovina) Aldin Šetkić	(Austria) David Pichler (Ukraine) Vladyslav Manafov	(Poland) Adrian Andrzejczuk (Netherlands) Gijs Brouwer (Czech Republic) Jaroslav Pospíšil (Czech Republic) Tomáš Papík
April 3	Egypt F12 Futures; Sharm El Sheikh, Egypt; Hard $15,000; Singles and doubles draws	(Canada) Filip Peliwo (Bosnia and Herzegovina) Aldin Šetkić; 4–6, 6–3, [14–12]	(Ukraine) Vladyslav Manafov (Ukraine) Daniil Zarichanskyy	(Austria) David Pichler (Ukraine) Vladyslav Manafov	(Poland) Adrian Andrzejczuk (Netherlands) Gijs Brouwer (Czech Republic) Jaroslav Pospíšil (Czech Republic) Tomáš Papík
April 3	Greece F5 Futures; Heraklion, Greece; Hard $15,000; Singles and doubles draws	(Czech Republic) Petr Michnev; 6–2, 7–5	(France) Benjamin Bonzi	(Italy) Liam Caruana (Slovakia) Patrik Néma	(Italy) Andrea Vavassori (Slovakia) Alex Molčan (Czech Republic) Robin Staněk (Canada) Martin Beran
April 3	Greece F5 Futures; Heraklion, Greece; Hard $15,000; Singles and doubles draws	(France) Benjamin Bonzi (France) Rémi Boutillier; 6–3, 6–7^{(8–10)}, [10–6]	(United States) Nick Chappell (United States) Robert Galloway	(Italy) Liam Caruana (Slovakia) Patrik Néma	(Italy) Andrea Vavassori (Slovakia) Alex Molčan (Czech Republic) Robin Staněk (Canada) Martin Beran
April 3	Indonesia F5 Futures; Jakarta, Indonesia; Hard $15,000; Singles and doubles draws	(Chinese Taipei) Chen Ti; 3–6, 7–6^{(7–2)}, 6–3	(United Kingdom) Brydan Klein	(Australia) Max Purcell (United Kingdom) Jonathan Gray	(Chinese Taipei) Yu Cheng-yu (Japan) Kento Takeuchi (Indonesia) Muhammad Rifqi Fitriadi (Australia) Blake Ellis
April 3	Indonesia F5 Futures; Jakarta, Indonesia; Hard $15,000; Singles and doubles draws	(Chinese Taipei) Hung Jui-chen (Chinese Taipei) Yu Cheng-yu; 6–3, 6–3	(Japan) Soichiro Moritani (Japan) Kento Takeuchi	(Australia) Max Purcell (United Kingdom) Jonathan Gray	(Chinese Taipei) Yu Cheng-yu (Japan) Kento Takeuchi (Indonesia) Muhammad Rifqi Fitriadi (Australia) Blake Ellis
April 3	Japan F5 Futures; Kashiwa, Japan; Hard $15,000; Singles and doubles draws	(Japan) Tatsuma Ito; 6–4, 6–2	(Japan) Masato Shiga	(Japan) Yusuke Takahashi (Japan) Yusuke Watanuki	(Chinese Taipei) Wu Tung-lin (Japan) Sho Katayama (Japan) Shintaro Imai (Japan) Takuto Niki
April 3	Japan F5 Futures; Kashiwa, Japan; Hard $15,000; Singles and doubles draws	(Japan) Shintaro Imai (Japan) Takuto Niki; 6–4, 6–4	(Japan) Katsuki Nagao (Japan) Hiromasa Oku	(Japan) Yusuke Takahashi (Japan) Yusuke Watanuki	(Chinese Taipei) Wu Tung-lin (Japan) Sho Katayama (Japan) Shintaro Imai (Japan) Takuto Niki
April 3	Portugal F5 Futures; Cascais, Portugal; Clay $15,000; Singles and doubles draws	(Spain) Gerard Granollers; 6–1, 6–3	(Japan) Makoto Ochi	(Belgium) Clément Geens (Portugal) João Monteiro	(Portugal) Nuno Deus (Spain) David Vega Hernández (Netherlands) Miliaan Niesten (France) Maxime Chazal
April 3	Portugal F5 Futures; Cascais, Portugal; Clay $15,000; Singles and doubles draws	(Belgium) Clément Geens (Belgium) Jeroen Vanneste; 6–1, 4–6, [10–4]	(Ukraine) Marat Deviatiarov (Portugal) Gonçalo Oliveira	(Belgium) Clément Geens (Portugal) João Monteiro	(Portugal) Nuno Deus (Spain) David Vega Hernández (Netherlands) Miliaan Niesten (France) Maxime Chazal
April 3	Qatar F1 Futures; Doha, Qatar; Hard $15,000; Singles and doubles draws	(Germany) Daniel Altmaier; 6–4, 6–3	(France) Antoine Escoffier	(Austria) Lenny Hampel (France) Mick Lescure	(Sweden) Markus Eriksson (United Kingdom) James Marsalek (Slovakia) Filip Horanský (Switzerland) Antoine Bellier
April 3	Qatar F1 Futures; Doha, Qatar; Hard $15,000; Singles and doubles draws	(Chile) Jorge Montero (Netherlands) Sem Verbeek; 6–4, 6–7^{(5–7)}, [10–7]	(Sweden) Markus Eriksson (Sweden) Milos Sekulic	(Austria) Lenny Hampel (France) Mick Lescure	(Sweden) Markus Eriksson (United Kingdom) James Marsalek (Slovakia) Filip Horanský (Switzerland) Antoine Bellier
April 3	Tunisia F13 Futures; Hammamet, Tunisia; Clay $15,000; Singles and doubles draws	(France) Geoffrey Blancaneaux; 4–6, 6–3, 6–0	(Italy) Cristian Carli	(Italy) Nicola Ghedin (Germany) Peter Torebko	(Italy) Roberto Marcora (Netherlands) Colin van Beem (Netherlands) Lennert van der Linden (France) Alexandre Müller
April 3	Tunisia F13 Futures; Hammamet, Tunisia; Clay $15,000; Singles and doubles draws	(Spain) Sergio Martos Gornés (Spain) Pol Toledo Bagué; 6–2, 6–4	(France) Amaury Delmas (Switzerland) Loïc Perret	(Italy) Nicola Ghedin (Germany) Peter Torebko	(Italy) Roberto Marcora (Netherlands) Colin van Beem (Netherlands) Lennert van der Linden (France) Alexandre Müller
April 3	Turkey F13 Futures; Antalya, Turkey; Clay $15,000; Singles and doubles draws	(France) Alexis Musialek; 6–3, 6–7^{(5–7)}, 7–6^{(7–1)}	(Peru) Juan Pablo Varillas	(Brazil) Wilson Leite (Belgium) Julien Cagnina	(Croatia) Kristijan Mesaroš (Argentina) Mariano Kestelboim (Germany) Christoph Negritu (Germany) Marvin Netuschil
April 3	Turkey F13 Futures; Antalya, Turkey; Clay $15,000; Singles and doubles draws	(Argentina) Santiago Rodríguez Taverna (Ukraine) Volodymyr Uzhylovskyi; 5–7, 7–5, [10–3]	(Germany) Christoph Negritu (Czech Republic) Pavel Nejedlý	(Brazil) Wilson Leite (Belgium) Julien Cagnina	(Croatia) Kristijan Mesaroš (Argentina) Mariano Kestelboim (Germany) Christoph Negritu (Germany) Marvin Netuschil
April 10	China F5 Futures; Luzhou, China; Hard $25,000; Singles and doubles draws	(China) Sun Fajing; 7–6^{(7–2)}, 6–2	(Australia) Bradley Mousley	(Australia) Harry Bourchier (Japan) Shuichi Sekiguchi	(Chinese Taipei) Lee Kuan-yi (China) Gao Xin (China) Zhang Zhizhen (Poland) Andriej Kapaś
April 10	China F5 Futures; Luzhou, China; Hard $25,000; Singles and doubles draws	(China) He Yecong (China) Zhang Zhizhen; 7–6^{(7–5)}, 6–3	(Chinese Taipei) Peng Hsien-yin (China) Xia Zihao	(Australia) Harry Bourchier (Japan) Shuichi Sekiguchi	(Chinese Taipei) Lee Kuan-yi (China) Gao Xin (China) Zhang Zhizhen (Poland) Andriej Kapaś
April 10	USA F13 Futures; Little Rock, United States; Hard $25,000; Singles and doubles draws	(Canada) Brayden Schnur; 7–6^{(7–4)}, 6–1	(Canada) Philip Bester	(United States) Eric Quigley (United States) Jared Hiltzik	(Belgium) Yannick Mertens (United States) Ulises Blanch (United States) Winston Lin (France) Calvin Hemery
April 10	USA F13 Futures; Little Rock, United States; Hard $25,000; Singles and doubles draws	(United Kingdom) Luke Bambridge (Australia) Gavin van Peperzeel; 2–6, 6–3, [11–9]	(Canada) Philip Bester (Croatia) Ante Pavić	(United States) Eric Quigley (United States) Jared Hiltzik	(Belgium) Yannick Mertens (United States) Ulises Blanch (United States) Winston Lin (France) Calvin Hemery
April 10	Egypt F13 Futures; Sharm El Sheikh, Egypt; Hard $15,000; Singles and doubles draws	(Bosnia and Herzegovina) Aldin Šetkić; 3–6, 6–2, 6–0	(France) Gleb Sakharov	(Egypt) Youssef Hossam (Austria) David Pichler	(Spain) Iouri Syromolotov Netrebina (Argentina) Franco Emanuel Egea (Czech Republic) Jaroslav Pospíšil (Canada) Filip Peliwo
April 10	Egypt F13 Futures; Sharm El Sheikh, Egypt; Hard $15,000; Singles and doubles draws	(Poland) Adrian Andrzejczuk (Poland) Mateusz Smolicki; 6–7^{(4–7)}, 6–4, [10–5]	(Egypt) Sherif Sabry (Germany) George von Massow	(Egypt) Youssef Hossam (Austria) David Pichler	(Spain) Iouri Syromolotov Netrebina (Argentina) Franco Emanuel Egea (Czech Republic) Jaroslav Pospíšil (Canada) Filip Peliwo
April 10	Indonesia F6 Futures; Jakarta, Indonesia; Hard $15,000; Singles and doubles draws	(Chinese Taipei) Chen Ti; 6–3, 6–4	(Australia) Max Purcell	(United Kingdom) Brydan Klein (United Kingdom) Jonathan Gray	(Chinese Taipei) Hung Jui-chen (Japan) Soichiro Moritani (Australia) Jake Delaney (Australia) Dane Propoggia
April 10	Indonesia F6 Futures; Jakarta, Indonesia; Hard $15,000; Singles and doubles draws	(Japan) Soichiro Moritani (Japan) Kento Takeuchi; 6–4, 3–6, [11–9]	(Indonesia) Justin Barki (Indonesia) Christopher Rungkat	(United Kingdom) Brydan Klein (United Kingdom) Jonathan Gray	(Chinese Taipei) Hung Jui-chen (Japan) Soichiro Moritani (Australia) Jake Delaney (Australia) Dane Propoggia
April 10	Italy F8 Futures; Pula, Italy; Clay $15,000; Singles and doubles draws	(Germany) Yannick Maden; 2–6, 6–1, 6–3	(Argentina) Andrea Collarini	(Austria) Michael Linzer (Italy) Omar Giacalone	(Argentina) Juan Pablo Ficovich (Italy) Walter Trusendi (Italy) Pietro Licciardi (Romania) Vasile Antonescu
April 10	Italy F8 Futures; Pula, Italy; Clay $15,000; Singles and doubles draws	(Switzerland) Adrian Bodmer (Germany) Jakob Sude; 7–6^{(7–5)}, 4–6, [10–1]	(Argentina) Andrea Collarini (United States) Rhyne Williams	(Austria) Michael Linzer (Italy) Omar Giacalone	(Argentina) Juan Pablo Ficovich (Italy) Walter Trusendi (Italy) Pietro Licciardi (Romania) Vasile Antonescu
April 10	Kazakhstan F3 Futures; Shymkent, Kazakhstan; Clay $15,000; Singles and doubles draws	(Spain) Mario Vilella Martínez; 6–4, 3–6, 6–0	(Czech Republic) Zdeněk Kolář	(Uzbekistan) Sanjar Fayziev (France) Maxime Tabatruong	(Kazakhstan) Dmitry Popko (Russia) Ivan Gakhov (Russia) Ivan Nedelko (Russia) Maxim Ratniuk
April 10	Kazakhstan F3 Futures; Shymkent, Kazakhstan; Clay $15,000; Singles and doubles draws	(Uzbekistan) Sanjar Fayziev (Russia) Ivan Gakhov; 7–6^{(7–3)}, 6–3	(Czech Republic) Libor Salaba (Slovakia) Adrian Sikora	(Uzbekistan) Sanjar Fayziev (France) Maxime Tabatruong	(Kazakhstan) Dmitry Popko (Russia) Ivan Gakhov (Russia) Ivan Nedelko (Russia) Maxim Ratniuk
April 10	Portugal F6 Futures; Porto, Portugal; Clay $15,000; Singles and doubles draws	(Brazil) Daniel Dutra da Silva; 6–2, 3–6, 6–4	(Portugal) João Domingues	(Spain) Javier Martí (Spain) Roberto Ortega Olmedo	(Portugal) Gonçalo Oliveira (Spain) Gerard Granollers (Spain) Carlos Gómez-Herrera (Portugal) Fred Gil
April 10	Portugal F6 Futures; Porto, Portugal; Clay $15,000; Singles and doubles draws	(Portugal) João Monteiro (Brazil) Bruno Sant'Anna; 4–6, 6–3, [10–8]	(Spain) Roberto Ortega Olmedo (Spain) David Vega Hernández	(Spain) Javier Martí (Spain) Roberto Ortega Olmedo	(Portugal) Gonçalo Oliveira (Spain) Gerard Granollers (Spain) Carlos Gómez-Herrera (Portugal) Fred Gil
April 10	Qatar F2 Futures; Doha, Qatar; Hard $15,000; Singles and doubles draws	(France) Antoine Escoffier; 6–2, 6–7^{(2–7)}, 6–4	(Germany) Daniel Altmaier	(Germany) Mats Moraing (France) Albano Olivetti	(France) David Guez (Austria) Lenny Hampel (Russia) Vitaly Kozyukov (Slovakia) Filip Horanský
April 10	Qatar F2 Futures; Doha, Qatar; Hard $15,000; Singles and doubles draws	(Sweden) Markus Eriksson (Sweden) Milos Sekulic; 7–5, 3–6, [10–7]	(Germany) Daniel Altmaier (Austria) Lucas Miedler	(Germany) Mats Moraing (France) Albano Olivetti	(France) David Guez (Austria) Lenny Hampel (Russia) Vitaly Kozyukov (Slovakia) Filip Horanský
April 10	Tunisia F14 Futures; Hammamet, Tunisia; Clay $15,000; Singles and doubles draws	(Belgium) Christopher Heyman; 6–4, 6–3	(France) Jules Okala	(Morocco) Lamine Ouahab (United Kingdom) Jay Clarke	(France) Ugo Humbert (Argentina) Hernán Casanova (Italy) Davide Galoppini (France) Jonathan Kanar
April 10	Tunisia F14 Futures; Hammamet, Tunisia; Clay $15,000; Singles and doubles draws	(France) Antoine Hoang (Morocco) Lamine Ouahab; 6–3, 6–4	(Bosnia and Herzegovina) Nerman Fatić (Italy) David Galoppini	(Morocco) Lamine Ouahab (United Kingdom) Jay Clarke	(France) Ugo Humbert (Argentina) Hernán Casanova (Italy) Davide Galoppini (France) Jonathan Kanar
April 10	Turkey F14 Futures; Antalya, Turkey; Clay $15,000; Singles and doubles draws	(Turkey) Marsel İlhan; 6–2, 7–5	(Croatia) Mate Delić	(Brazil) Wilson Leite (Turkey) Altuğ Çelikbilek	(Sweden) Isak Arvidsson (Bosnia and Herzegovina) Tomislav Brkić (Austria) Thomas Statzberger (Brazil) Igor Marcondes
April 10	Turkey F14 Futures; Antalya, Turkey; Clay $15,000; Singles and doubles draws	(Sweden) Isak Arvidsson (Turkey) Anıl Yüksel; 6–4, 6–0	(Chile) Juan Carlos Sáez (Ukraine) Volodymyr Uzhylovskyi	(Brazil) Wilson Leite (Turkey) Altuğ Çelikbilek	(Sweden) Isak Arvidsson (Bosnia and Herzegovina) Tomislav Brkić (Austria) Thomas Statzberger (Brazil) Igor Marcondes
April 17	Italy F9 Futures; Pula, Italy; Clay $25,000; Singles and doubles draws	(Italy) Salvatore Caruso; 6–3, 6–3	(Brazil) Guilherme Clezar	(Germany) Yannick Maden (France) Laurent Lokoli	(Croatia) Viktor Galović (Greece) Stefanos Tsitsipas (Italy) Andrea Pellegrino (Italy) Riccardo Bonadio
April 17	Italy F9 Futures; Pula, Italy; Clay $25,000; Singles and doubles draws	(Italy) Lorenzo Frigerio (Croatia) Viktor Galović; 6–3, 3–6, [10–7]	(Poland) Mateusz Kowalczyk (Poland) Grzegorz Panfil	(Germany) Yannick Maden (France) Laurent Lokoli	(Croatia) Viktor Galović (Greece) Stefanos Tsitsipas (Italy) Andrea Pellegrino (Italy) Riccardo Bonadio
April 17	Uzbekistan F1 Futures; Bukhara, Uzbekistan; Hard $25,000; Singles and doubles draws	(Belarus) Egor Gerasimov; 6–1, 7–5	(Kazakhstan) Dmitry Popko	(Russia) Markos Kalovelonis (Ukraine) Vadym Ursu	(Uzbekistan) Temur Ismailov (India) Vishnu Vardhan (Uzbekistan) Sanjar Fayziev (Russia) Aleksandr Lobkov
April 17	Uzbekistan F1 Futures; Bukhara, Uzbekistan; Hard $25,000; Singles and doubles draws	(India) Sriram Balaji (India) Vishnu Vardhan; 6–4, 7–5	(Belarus) Sergey Betov (Ukraine) Vladyslav Manafov	(Russia) Markos Kalovelonis (Ukraine) Vadym Ursu	(Uzbekistan) Temur Ismailov (India) Vishnu Vardhan (Uzbekistan) Sanjar Fayziev (Russia) Aleksandr Lobkov
April 17	Egypt F14 Futures; Sharm El Sheikh, Egypt; Hard $15,000; Singles and doubles draws	(Canada) Filip Peliwo; 6–3, 6–3	(Egypt) Issam Haitham Taweel	(Republic of Ireland) Sam Barry (China) Te Rigele	(Ukraine) Olexiy Kolisnyk (Netherlands) Lennert van der Linden (Germany) George von Massow (Denmark) August Holmgren
April 17	Egypt F14 Futures; Sharm El Sheikh, Egypt; Hard $15,000; Singles and doubles draws	(Netherlands) Lennert van der Linden (Germany) George von Massow; 6–3, 7–6^{(7–4)}	(Egypt) Issam Haitham Taweel (Egypt) Youssef Hossam	(Republic of Ireland) Sam Barry (China) Te Rigele	(Ukraine) Olexiy Kolisnyk (Netherlands) Lennert van der Linden (Germany) George von Massow (Denmark) August Holmgren
April 17	France F8 Futures; La Grande-Motte, France; Hard $15,000; Singles and doubles draws	(France) David Guez; 6–4, 7–5	(France) Yanaïs Laurent	(France) Yannick Jankovits (France) Thomas Bréchemier	(Belgium) Maxime Authom (Italy) Erik Crepaldi (United States) Connor Farren (France) Mick Lescure
April 17	France F8 Futures; La Grande-Motte, France; Hard $15,000; Singles and doubles draws	(United Kingdom) Scott Clayton (United Kingdom) Jonny O'Mara; 6–4, 6–2	(France) Yannick Jankovits (France) Jonathan Kanar	(France) Yannick Jankovits (France) Thomas Bréchemier	(Belgium) Maxime Authom (Italy) Erik Crepaldi (United States) Connor Farren (France) Mick Lescure
April 17	Kazakhstan F4 Futures; Shymkent, Kazakhstan; Clay $15,000; Singles and doubles draws	(Serbia) Danilo Petrović; 7–6^{(7–3)}, 6–3	(Czech Republic) Zdeněk Kolář	(Spain) Mario Vilella Martínez (Russia) Ivan Gakhov	(Russia) Alexander Zhurbin (France) Manuel Guinard (Russia) Aleksandr Vasilenko (Croatia) Nino Serdarušić
April 17	Kazakhstan F4 Futures; Shymkent, Kazakhstan; Clay $15,000; Singles and doubles draws	(Czech Republic) Zdeněk Kolář (Croatia) Nino Serdarušić; 6–2, 6–2	(Spain) Mario Vilella Martínez (Russia) Alexander Zhurbin	(Spain) Mario Vilella Martínez (Russia) Ivan Gakhov	(Russia) Alexander Zhurbin (France) Manuel Guinard (Russia) Aleksandr Vasilenko (Croatia) Nino Serdarušić
April 17	Portugal F7 Futures; Carcavelos, Portugal; Clay $15,000; Singles and doubles draws	(Portugal) João Domingues; 6–3, 6–1	(France) Maxime Chazal	(Spain) Bernabé Zapata Miralles (Spain) Marc Giner	(Portugal) Pedro Sousa (Portugal) Frederico Ferreira Silva (Spain) David Vega Hernández (Spain) Ricardo Ojeda Lara
April 17	Portugal F7 Futures; Carcavelos, Portugal; Clay $15,000; Singles and doubles draws	(Portugal) Felipe Cunha e Silva (Portugal) Fred Gil; 4–6, 6–3, [10–7]	(Portugal) Frederico Ferreira Silva (Spain) David Vega Hernández	(Spain) Bernabé Zapata Miralles (Spain) Marc Giner	(Portugal) Pedro Sousa (Portugal) Frederico Ferreira Silva (Spain) David Vega Hernández (Spain) Ricardo Ojeda Lara
April 17	Qatar F3 Futures; Doha, Qatar; Hard $15,000; Singles and doubles draws	(Austria) Lucas Miedler; 6–3, 6–3	(Belgium) Jonas Merckx	(Germany) Mats Moraing (Belarus) Yaraslav Shyla	(Germany) Daniel Altmaier (Austria) Lenny Hampel (Russia) Vitaly Kozyukov (Poland) Hubert Hurkacz
April 17	Qatar F3 Futures; Doha, Qatar; Hard $15,000; Singles and doubles draws	(Poland) Hubert Hurkacz (Sweden) Milos Sekulic; 1–6, 3–3 ret.	(United States) Anderson Reed (Netherlands) Sem Verbeek	(Germany) Mats Moraing (Belarus) Yaraslav Shyla	(Germany) Daniel Altmaier (Austria) Lenny Hampel (Russia) Vitaly Kozyukov (Poland) Hubert Hurkacz
April 17	Tunisia F15 Futures; Hammamet, Tunisia; Clay $15,000; Singles and doubles draws	(Italy) Matteo Viola; 6–4, 6–3	(Argentina) Hernán Casanova	(Russia) Kirill Dmitriev (France) Antoine Hoang	(Montenegro) Ljubomir Čelebić (France) Elliot Benchetrit (Spain) Pedro Martínez (Belgium) Omar Salman
April 17	Tunisia F15 Futures; Hammamet, Tunisia; Clay $15,000; Singles and doubles draws	(Argentina) Franco Agamenone (Argentina) Hernán Casanova; 7–5, 1–6, [10–5]	(France) Geoffrey Blancaneaux (France) Antoine Hoang	(Russia) Kirill Dmitriev (France) Antoine Hoang	(Montenegro) Ljubomir Čelebić (France) Elliot Benchetrit (Spain) Pedro Martínez (Belgium) Omar Salman
April 17	Turkey F15 Futures; Antalya, Turkey; Clay $15,000; Singles and doubles draws	(Uruguay) Martín Cuevas; 4–6, 6–4, 6–1	(Croatia) Mate Delić	(Brazil) Pedro Sakamoto (Peru) Juan Pablo Varillas	(Argentina) Andrea Collarini (Turkey) Cem İlkel (Turkey) Marsel İlhan (Bulgaria) Dimitar Kuzmanov
April 17	Turkey F15 Futures; Antalya, Turkey; Clay $15,000; Singles and doubles draws	(Sweden) Isak Arvidsson (Brazil) Pedro Sakamoto; 6–3, 6–3	(Turkey) Sarp Ağabigün (Turkey) Altuğ Çelikbilek	(Brazil) Pedro Sakamoto (Peru) Juan Pablo Varillas	(Argentina) Andrea Collarini (Turkey) Cem İlkel (Turkey) Marsel İlhan (Bulgaria) Dimitar Kuzmanov
April 17	USA F14 Futures; Orange Park, United States; Clay $15,000; Singles and doubles draws	(Colombia) Felipe Mantilla; 6–2, 6–4	(France) Calvin Hemery	(United States) Gianni Ross (United States) Evan King	(Japan) Kaichi Uchida (Brazil) Thales Turini (Argentina) Santiago Rodríguez Taverna (Argentina) Genaro Alberto Olivieri
April 17	USA F14 Futures; Orange Park, United States; Clay $15,000; Singles and doubles draws	(United States) Evan King (United States) Hunter Reese; 2–6, 7–5, [10–8]	(Australia) Daniel Nolan (Japan) Yosuke Watanuki	(United States) Gianni Ross (United States) Evan King	(Japan) Kaichi Uchida (Brazil) Thales Turini (Argentina) Santiago Rodríguez Taverna (Argentina) Genaro Alberto Olivieri
April 24	France F9 Futures; Angers, France; Clay (indoor) $25,000; Singles and doubles draws	(France) Gleb Sakharov; 6–4, 6–4	(France) Geoffrey Blancaneaux	(France) Laurent Lokoli (Netherlands) Boy Westerhof	(Belgium) Maxime Authom (Italy) Erik Crepaldi (France) Grégoire Jacq (France) Maxime Janvier
April 24	France F9 Futures; Angers, France; Clay (indoor) $25,000; Singles and doubles draws	(France) Grégoire Barrère (France) Alexis Musialek; 6–3, 3–6, [10–4]	(Belgium) Maxime Authom (France) Grégoire Jacq	(France) Laurent Lokoli (Netherlands) Boy Westerhof	(Belgium) Maxime Authom (Italy) Erik Crepaldi (France) Grégoire Jacq (France) Maxime Janvier
April 24	Italy F10 Futures; Pula, Italy; Clay $25,000; Singles and doubles draws	(Sweden) Christian Lindell; 6–4, 6–1	(South Africa) Lloyd Harris	(Austria) Michael Linzer (Italy) Walter Trusendi	(Italy) Lorenzo Frigerio (Italy) Marco Bortolotti (France) Alexandre Müller (Belgium) Joris De Loore
April 24	Italy F10 Futures; Pula, Italy; Clay $25,000; Singles and doubles draws	(Switzerland) Adrian Bodmer (Germany) Jakob Sude; 4–6, 7–6^{(9–7)}, [10–5]	(Poland) Mateusz Kowalczyk (Poland) Grzegorz Panfil	(Austria) Michael Linzer (Italy) Walter Trusendi	(Italy) Lorenzo Frigerio (Italy) Marco Bortolotti (France) Alexandre Müller (Belgium) Joris De Loore
April 24	Uzbekistan F2 Futures; Qarshi, Uzbekistan; Hard $25,000; Singles and doubles draws	(Uzbekistan) Sanjar Fayziev; 7–6^{(7–4)}, 5–7, 7–6^{(7–5)}	(Belarus) Egor Gerasimov	(Estonia) Vladimir Ivanov (Serbia) Nikola Ćaćić	(Kazakhstan) Dmitry Popko (Uzbekistan) Jurabek Karimov (India) Vishnu Vardhan (Uzbekistan) Temur Ismailov
April 24	Uzbekistan F2 Futures; Qarshi, Uzbekistan; Hard $25,000; Singles and doubles draws	(Uzbekistan) Sanjar Fayziev (Kazakhstan) Timur Khabibulin; 7–6^{(7–3)}, 6–3	(India) Sriram Balaji (India) Vishnu Vardhan	(Estonia) Vladimir Ivanov (Serbia) Nikola Ćaćić	(Kazakhstan) Dmitry Popko (Uzbekistan) Jurabek Karimov (India) Vishnu Vardhan (Uzbekistan) Temur Ismailov
April 24	Egypt F15 Futures; Sharm El Sheikh, Egypt; Hard $15,000; Singles and doubles draws	(Canada) Filip Peliwo; 6–3, 6–4	(Tunisia) Moez Echargui	(Republic of Ireland) Sam Barry (Egypt) Youssef Hossam	(Croatia) Duje Kekez (Netherlands) Lennert van der Linden (China) Te Rigele (Egypt) Issam Haitham Taweel
April 24	Egypt F15 Futures; Sharm El Sheikh, Egypt; Hard $15,000; Singles and doubles draws	(Spain) David Jordà Sanchis (Spain) Jaime Pulgar-García; 6–4, 3–6, [10–1]	(Ukraine) Vladyslav Orlov (Canada) Filip Peliwo	(Republic of Ireland) Sam Barry (Egypt) Youssef Hossam	(Croatia) Duje Kekez (Netherlands) Lennert van der Linden (China) Te Rigele (Egypt) Issam Haitham Taweel
April 24	Israel F4 Futures; Ramat Gan, Israel; Hard $15,000; Singles and doubles draws	(Israel) Edan Leshem; 6–3, 5–5 ret.	(Germany) Mats Moraing	(France) Antoine Escoffier (Israel) Yshai Oliel	(Germany) Mats Rosenkranz (Italy) Liam Caruana (France) Alexis Gautier (Israel) Igor Smilansky
April 24	Israel F4 Futures; Ramat Gan, Israel; Hard $15,000; Singles and doubles draws	(Argentina) Matías Franco Descotte (France) Hugo Voljacques; 6–3, 6–4	(Israel) Ram Kapach (Israel) Yasha Zemel	(France) Antoine Escoffier (Israel) Yshai Oliel	(Germany) Mats Rosenkranz (Italy) Liam Caruana (France) Alexis Gautier (Israel) Igor Smilansky
April 24	Kazakhstan F5 Futures; Shymkent, Kazakhstan; Clay $15,000; Singles and doubles draws	(Russia) Ivan Gakhov; 6–3, 6–2	(Spain) Mario Vilella Martínez	(Russia) Aleksandr Vasilenko (Serbia) Danilo Petrović	(Russia) Yan Sabanin (Croatia) Nino Serdarušić (Russia) Ilya Vasilyev (Sweden) Jonathan Mridha
April 24	Kazakhstan F5 Futures; Shymkent, Kazakhstan; Clay $15,000; Singles and doubles draws	(Russia) Alexander Pavlioutchenkov (Serbia) Danilo Petrović; 6–7^{(4–7)}, 6–0, [10–5]	(Russia) Ivan Gakhov (Kazakhstan) Roman Khassanov	(Russia) Aleksandr Vasilenko (Serbia) Danilo Petrović	(Russia) Yan Sabanin (Croatia) Nino Serdarušić (Russia) Ilya Vasilyev (Sweden) Jonathan Mridha
April 24	Spain F11 Futures; Majadahonda, Spain; Clay $15,000; Singles and doubles draws	(Spain) Javier Martí; 6–3, 6–0	(Brazil) Daniel Dutra da Silva	(China) Wu Yibing (Italy) Raúl Brancaccio	(Spain) Adria Mas Mascolo (Sweden) Markus Eriksson (Poland) Maciej Rajski (United Kingdom) Billy Harris
April 24	Spain F11 Futures; Majadahonda, Spain; Clay $15,000; Singles and doubles draws	(Brazil) Rafael Matos (Brazil) Marcelo Zormann; 3–6, 7–6^{(7–5)}, [11–9]	(Spain) Alberto Romero de Ávila Senise (Spain) Miguel Semmler	(China) Wu Yibing (Italy) Raúl Brancaccio	(Spain) Adria Mas Mascolo (Sweden) Markus Eriksson (Poland) Maciej Rajski (United Kingdom) Billy Harris
April 24	Tunisia F16 Futures; Hammamet, Tunisia; Clay $15,000; Singles and doubles draws	(Spain) Pedro Martínez; 6–3, 6–3	(Morocco) Lamine Ouahab	(France) Antoine Hoang (Italy) Andrea Vavassori	(Germany) Tobias Simon (Montenegro) Ljubomir Čelebić (Portugal) Gonçalo Oliveira (France) Benjamin Bonzi
April 24	Tunisia F16 Futures; Hammamet, Tunisia; Clay $15,000; Singles and doubles draws	(Bosnia and Herzegovina) Darko Bojanović (Sweden) Dragoș Nicolae Mădăraș; 2–6, 6–4, [11–9]	(France) Benjamin Bonzi (France) Antoine Hoang	(France) Antoine Hoang (Italy) Andrea Vavassori	(Germany) Tobias Simon (Montenegro) Ljubomir Čelebić (Portugal) Gonçalo Oliveira (France) Benjamin Bonzi
April 24	Turkey F16 Futures; Antalya, Turkey; Clay $15,000; Singles and doubles draws	(Uruguay) Martín Cuevas; 4–6, 6–4, 6–2	(Turkey) Marsel İlhan	(Bulgaria) Alexandar Lazov (Peru) Juan Pablo Varillas	(Netherlands) Thiemo de Bakker (Russia) Roman Safiullin (Bulgaria) Dimitar Kuzmanov (Turkey) Altuğ Çelikbilek
April 24	Turkey F16 Futures; Antalya, Turkey; Clay $15,000; Singles and doubles draws	(Uruguay) Martín Cuevas (Peru) Juan Pablo Varillas; 6–2, 6–4	(United Kingdom) Joel Cannell (Australia) James Frawley	(Bulgaria) Alexandar Lazov (Peru) Juan Pablo Varillas	(Netherlands) Thiemo de Bakker (Russia) Roman Safiullin (Bulgaria) Dimitar Kuzmanov (Turkey) Altuğ Çelikbilek
April 24	USA F15 Futures; Vero Beach, United States; Clay $15,000; Singles and doubles draws	(France) Calvin Hemery; 6–3, 6–1	(United States) Sam Riffice	(Australia) Gavin van Peperzeel (Belgium) Julien Cagnina	(Venezuela) Ricardo Rodríguez (Hungary) Péter Nagy (Argentina) Facundo Mena (United Kingdom) Marcus Willis
April 24	USA F15 Futures; Vero Beach, United States; Clay $15,000; Singles and doubles draws	(Brazil) Alex Blumenberg (Brazil) Thales Turini; 6–4, 2–6, [10–7]	(Belgium) Julien Cagnina (France) Calvin Hemery	(Australia) Gavin van Peperzeel (Belgium) Julien Cagnina	(Venezuela) Ricardo Rodríguez (Hungary) Péter Nagy (Argentina) Facundo Mena (United Kingdom) Marcus Willis

=== May ===
Week of	Tournament	Winner	Runners-up	Semifinalists	Quarterfinalists
May 1	Nigeria F1 Futures; Abuja, Nigeria; Hard $25,000; Singles and doubles draws	(Canada) Brayden Schnur; 7–6^{(7–2)}, 6–4	(Brazil) Fabiano de Paula	(Tunisia) Moez Echargui (Zimbabwe) Takanyi Garanganga	(Norway) Viktor Durasovic (India) Haadin Bava (Italy) Alessandro Bega (Zimbabwe) Benjamin Lock
May 1	Nigeria F1 Futures; Abuja, Nigeria; Hard $25,000; Singles and doubles draws	(Brazil) Fabiano de Paula (Brazil) Fernando Romboli; 6–4, 6–7^{(5–7)}, [10–7]	(Italy) Alessandro Bega (Norway) Viktor Durasovic	(Tunisia) Moez Echargui (Zimbabwe) Takanyi Garanganga	(Norway) Viktor Durasovic (India) Haadin Bava (Italy) Alessandro Bega (Zimbabwe) Benjamin Lock
May 1	Spain F12 Futures; Lleida, Spain; Clay $25,000; Singles and doubles draws	(Spain) Pedro Martínez; 6–3, 5–7, 6–4	(Spain) Gerard Granollers	(Bolivia) Hugo Dellien (Australia) Jason Kubler	(Brazil) Daniel Dutra da Silva (France) Alexis Musialek (Italy) Erik Crepaldi (Belgium) Maxime Authom
May 1	Spain F12 Futures; Lleida, Spain; Clay $25,000; Singles and doubles draws	(Italy) Erik Crepaldi (Germany) Pascal Meis; 7–6^{(7–3)}, 6–4	(Bolivia) Boris Arias (China) Wu Yibing	(Bolivia) Hugo Dellien (Australia) Jason Kubler	(Brazil) Daniel Dutra da Silva (France) Alexis Musialek (Italy) Erik Crepaldi (Belgium) Maxime Authom
May 1	France F10 Futures; Grasse, France; Clay $15,000; Singles and doubles draws	(France) Corentin Moutet; 6–4, 6–3	(France) Alexandre Müller	(France) Maxime Chazal (France) Maxime Hamou	(France) Grégoire Barrère (Germany) Nils Langer (Italy) Adelchi Virgili (France) Romain Jouan
May 1	France F10 Futures; Grasse, France; Clay $15,000; Singles and doubles draws	(France) Maxime Chazal (France) Louis Tessa; 6–2, 1–6, [10–7]	(France) Grégoire Jacq (France) Hugo Nys	(France) Maxime Chazal (France) Maxime Hamou	(France) Grégoire Barrère (Germany) Nils Langer (Italy) Adelchi Virgili (France) Romain Jouan
May 1	Israel F5 Futures; Acre, Israel; Hard $15,000; Singles and doubles draws	(France) David Guez; 6–1, 6–2	(Israel) Igor Smilansky	(Argentina) Matías Franco Descotte (Germany) Mats Moraing	(Israel) Tal Goldengoren (United Kingdom) Neil Pauffley (Israel) Dekel Bar (Israel) Ben Patael
May 1	Israel F5 Futures; Acre, Israel; Hard $15,000; Singles and doubles draws	(Switzerland) Raphael Baltensperger (Italy) Liam Caruana; 7–6^{(7–3)}, 6–1	(Peru) Alexander Merino (United States) Michael Zhu	(Argentina) Matías Franco Descotte (Germany) Mats Moraing	(Israel) Tal Goldengoren (United Kingdom) Neil Pauffley (Israel) Dekel Bar (Israel) Ben Patael
May 1	Italy F11 Futures; Pula, Italy; Clay $15,000; Singles and doubles draws	(Switzerland) Adrian Bodmer; 6–3, 6–2	(Australia) Marc Polmans	(France) Samuel Bensoussan (Italy) Pietro Licciardi	(Italy) Simone Roncalli (Sweden) Christian Lindell (Argentina) Franco Agamenone (Italy) Riccardo Bonadio
May 1	Italy F11 Futures; Pula, Italy; Clay $15,000; Singles and doubles draws	(Switzerland) Adrian Bodmer (Germany) Jakob Sude; 6–3, 6–3	(Argentina) Federico Juan Aguilar (Argentina) Juan Pablo Ficovich	(France) Samuel Bensoussan (Italy) Pietro Licciardi	(Italy) Simone Roncalli (Sweden) Christian Lindell (Argentina) Franco Agamenone (Italy) Riccardo Bonadio
May 1	Mexico F2 Futures; Villahermosa, Mexico; Hard (indoor) $15,000; Singles and doubles draws	(United States) Kevin King; 7–5, 7–5	(Ecuador) Iván Endara	(United States) Evan Song (Argentina) Juan Ignacio Londero	(Bolivia) Federico Zeballos (Japan) Naoki Takeda (Venezuela) Luis David Martínez (Mexico) Manuel Sánchez
May 1	Mexico F2 Futures; Villahermosa, Mexico; Hard (indoor) $15,000; Singles and doubles draws	(United States) Kevin King (South Africa) Nicolaas Scholtz; 7–6^{(7–4)}, 7–6^{(7–4)}	(United Kingdom) Farris Fathi Gosea (United States) Nathaniel Lammons	(United States) Evan Song (Argentina) Juan Ignacio Londero	(Bolivia) Federico Zeballos (Japan) Naoki Takeda (Venezuela) Luis David Martínez (Mexico) Manuel Sánchez
May 1	Tunisia F17 Futures; Hammamet, Tunisia; Clay $15,000; Singles and doubles draws	(France) Benjamin Bonzi; 6–7^{(4–7)}, 6–0, 6–1	(Argentina) Juan Ignacio Galarza	(Italy) Cristian Carli (Colombia) Cristian Rodríguez	(France) Thomas Bréchemier (Germany) Tobias Simon (Morocco) Lamine Ouahab (Germany) Paul Wörner
May 1	Tunisia F17 Futures; Hammamet, Tunisia; Clay $15,000; Singles and doubles draws	(Uruguay) Santiago Maresca (Spain) David Pérez Sanz; 7–6^{(7–4)}, 5–7, [10–6]	(Tunisia) Anis Ghorbel (Colombia) Cristian Rodríguez	(Italy) Cristian Carli (Colombia) Cristian Rodríguez	(France) Thomas Bréchemier (Germany) Tobias Simon (Morocco) Lamine Ouahab (Germany) Paul Wörner
May 1	Turkey F17 Futures; Antalya, Turkey; Clay $15,000; Singles and doubles draws	(Austria) Dennis Novak; 6–2, 6–2	(Peru) Juan Pablo Varillas	(Netherlands) Michiel de Krom (Bulgaria) Alexandar Lazov	(Australia) James Frawley (Brazil) Bruno Sant'Anna (Brazil) Pedro Sakamoto (Serbia) Goran Marković
May 1	Turkey F17 Futures; Antalya, Turkey; Clay $15,000; Singles and doubles draws	(Turkey) Sarp Ağabigün (Ukraine) Volodymyr Uzhylovskyi; 7–6^{(7–1)}, 6–2	(United Kingdom) Joel Cannell (Argentina) Manuel Peña López	(Netherlands) Michiel de Krom (Bulgaria) Alexandar Lazov	(Australia) James Frawley (Brazil) Bruno Sant'Anna (Brazil) Pedro Sakamoto (Serbia) Goran Marković
May 1	USA F16 Futures; Tampa, United States; Clay $15,000; Singles and doubles draws	(Argentina) Facundo Mena; 6–4, 6–7^{(4–7)}, 6–0	(Japan) Kaichi Uchida	(Colombia) Felipe Mantilla (Argentina) Genaro Alberto Olivieri	(Argentina) Axel Geller (United States) Isaiah Strode (United States) Connor Smith (United States) Dennis Nevolo
May 1	USA F16 Futures; Tampa, United States; Clay $15,000; Singles and doubles draws	(Spain) Alberto Barroso Campos (Moldova) Alexandru Gozun; 6–2, 6–4	(United States) Connor Smith (United States) Rhyne Williams	(Colombia) Felipe Mantilla (Argentina) Genaro Alberto Olivieri	(Argentina) Axel Geller (United States) Isaiah Strode (United States) Connor Smith (United States) Dennis Nevolo
May 8	Italy F12 Futures; Naples, Italy; Clay $25,000; Singles and doubles draws	(Argentina) Juan Pablo Ficovich; 6–3, 6–4	(Netherlands) Boy Westerhof	(Argentina) Hernán Casanova (Germany) Nils Langer	(Belgium) Yannick Vandenbulcke (Italy) Davide Della Tommasina (Netherlands) Antal van der Duim (Germany) Tobias Simon
May 8	Italy F12 Futures; Naples, Italy; Clay $25,000; Singles and doubles draws	(Belgium) Sander Gillé (Belgium) Joran Vliegen; 6–4, 6–2	(Netherlands) Antal van der Duim (Netherlands) Boy Westerhof	(Argentina) Hernán Casanova (Germany) Nils Langer	(Belgium) Yannick Vandenbulcke (Italy) Davide Della Tommasina (Netherlands) Antal van der Duim (Germany) Tobias Simon
May 8	Nigeria F2 Futures; Abuja, Nigeria; Hard $25,000; Singles and doubles draws	(Serbia) Peđa Krstin; 6–2, 6–4	(France) Calvin Hemery	(Brazil) Fernando Romboli (Canada) Brayden Schnur	(India) Sasikumar Mukund (Italy) Alessandro Bega (Norway) Viktor Durasovic (Zimbabwe) Takanyi Garanganga
May 8	Nigeria F2 Futures; Abuja, Nigeria; Hard $25,000; Singles and doubles draws	(Italy) Alessandro Bega (Norway) Viktor Durasovic; 6–4, 6–0	(Nigeria) Sylvester Emmanuel (France) Calvin Hemery	(Brazil) Fernando Romboli (Canada) Brayden Schnur	(India) Sasikumar Mukund (Italy) Alessandro Bega (Norway) Viktor Durasovic (Zimbabwe) Takanyi Garanganga
May 8	Sweden F1 Futures; Karlskrona, Sweden; Clay $25,000; Singles and doubles draws	(Germany) Jan Choinski; 7–5, 4–6, 6–2	(Bolivia) Hugo Dellien	(Sweden) Markus Eriksson (Australia) Blake Mott	(Sweden) Karl Friberg (Germany) Marvin Möller (Sweden) Christian Lindell (Sweden) Isak Arvidsson
May 8	Sweden F1 Futures; Karlskrona, Sweden; Clay $25,000; Singles and doubles draws	(Uruguay) Martín Cuevas (Sweden) Christian Lindell; 6–4, 6–7^{(3–7)}, [11–9]	(Netherlands) David Pel (Netherlands) Botic van de Zandschulp	(Sweden) Markus Eriksson (Australia) Blake Mott	(Sweden) Karl Friberg (Germany) Marvin Möller (Sweden) Christian Lindell (Sweden) Isak Arvidsson
May 8	Bulgaria F1 Futures; Sozopol, Bulgaria; Hard $15,000; Singles and doubles draws	(France) Albano Olivetti; 6–4, 7–6^{(7–5)}	(Bulgaria) Dimitar Kuzmanov	(Russia) Yan Sabanin (Spain) Roberto Ortega Olmedo	(Romania) George Botezan (Czech Republic) Michal Konečný (France) Samuel Bensoussan (Romania) Dragoș Constantin Ignat
May 8	Bulgaria F1 Futures; Sozopol, Bulgaria; Hard $15,000; Singles and doubles draws	(Czech Republic) Michal Konečný (Spain) Roberto Ortega Olmedo; 4–6, 7–5, [11–9]	(Romania) Victor-Mugurel Anagnastopol (Romania) Victor Vlad Cornea	(Russia) Yan Sabanin (Spain) Roberto Ortega Olmedo	(Romania) George Botezan (Czech Republic) Michal Konečný (France) Samuel Bensoussan (Romania) Dragoș Constantin Ignat
May 8	China F6 Futures; Wuhan, China; Hard $15,000; Singles and doubles draws	(China) Wang Chuhan; 6–7^{(6–8)}, 6–4, 6–4	(Thailand) Wishaya Trongcharoenchaikul	(China) Chang Yu (Japan) Shintaro Imai	(Australia) Dayne Kelly (Japan) Masato Shiga (Japan) Soichiro Moritani (Latvia) Mārtiņš Podžus
May 8	China F6 Futures; Wuhan, China; Hard $15,000; Singles and doubles draws	(Japan) Masato Shiga (Japan) Soichiro Moritani; 7–6^{(7–5)}, 6–4	(Australia) Harry Bourchier (Australia) Dayne Kelly	(China) Chang Yu (Japan) Shintaro Imai	(Australia) Dayne Kelly (Japan) Masato Shiga (Japan) Soichiro Moritani (Latvia) Mārtiņš Podžus
May 8	Hungary F1 Futures; Zalaegerszeg, Hungary; Clay $15,000; Singles and doubles draws	(Hungary) Attila Balázs; 6–4, 6–4	(Austria) David Pichler	(Slovakia) Alex Molčan (Serbia) Nikola Ćaćić	(Croatia) Nino Serdarušić (Montenegro) Ljubomir Čelebić (Canada) Benjamin Sigouin (Austria) Pascal Brunner
May 8	Hungary F1 Futures; Zalaegerszeg, Hungary; Clay $15,000; Singles and doubles draws	(Hungary) Attila Balázs (Hungary) Gábor Borsos; 6–4, 6–2	(Austria) Pascal Brunner (Austria) David Pichler	(Slovakia) Alex Molčan (Serbia) Nikola Ćaćić	(Croatia) Nino Serdarušić (Montenegro) Ljubomir Čelebić (Canada) Benjamin Sigouin (Austria) Pascal Brunner
May 8	Israel F6 Futures; Acre, Israel; Hard $15,000; Singles and doubles draws	(Israel) Edan Leshem; 6–3, 6–3	(Israel) Ben Patael	(United States) Jared Hiltzik (Germany) Mats Moraing	(United States) Peter Kobelt (Spain) Javier Pulgar-García (France) David Guez (Canada) Filip Peliwo
May 8	Israel F6 Futures; Acre, Israel; Hard $15,000; Singles and doubles draws	(United States) Jared Hiltzik (United States) Tim Kopinski; 7–6^{(9–7)}, 6–1	(United States) Connor Farren (United Kingdom) Joshua Paris	(United States) Jared Hiltzik (Germany) Mats Moraing	(United States) Peter Kobelt (Spain) Javier Pulgar-García (France) David Guez (Canada) Filip Peliwo
May 8	Mexico F3 Futures; Córdoba, Mexico; Hard $15,000; Singles and doubles draws	(South Africa) Nicolaas Scholtz; 6–4, 6–3	(Ecuador) Iván Endara	(Chile) Marcelo Tomás Barrios Vera (United States) Kevin King	(Mexico) Tigre Hank (United States) Harrison Adams (Brazil) André Miele (Argentina) Juan Ignacio Londero
May 8	Mexico F3 Futures; Córdoba, Mexico; Hard $15,000; Singles and doubles draws	(United Kingdom) Farris Fathi Gosea (United States) Nathaniel Lammons; 6–4, 6–7^{(5–7)}, [10–8]	(United States) Hunter Callahan (Portugal) Bernardo Saraiva	(Chile) Marcelo Tomás Barrios Vera (United States) Kevin King	(Mexico) Tigre Hank (United States) Harrison Adams (Brazil) André Miele (Argentina) Juan Ignacio Londero
May 8	Spain F13 Futures; Valldoreix, Spain; Clay $15,000; Singles and doubles draws	(Argentina) Pedro Cachin; 6–2, 6–1	(Brazil) Orlando Luz	(Spain) Sergio Gutiérrez Ferrol (Brazil) Daniel Dutra da Silva	(Argentina) Federico Coria (Spain) Sergio Martos Gornés (Spain) David Vega Hernández (Spain) Jordi Samper Montaña
May 8	Spain F13 Futures; Valldoreix, Spain; Clay $15,000; Singles and doubles draws	(Brazil) Igor Marcondes (Brazil) Rafael Matos; 6–7^{(4–7)}, 7–6^{(8–6)}, [12–10]	(Spain) Pedro Martínez (Spain) David Vega Hernández	(Spain) Sergio Gutiérrez Ferrol (Brazil) Daniel Dutra da Silva	(Argentina) Federico Coria (Spain) Sergio Martos Gornés (Spain) David Vega Hernández (Spain) Jordi Samper Montaña
May 8	Tunisia F18 Futures; Hammamet, Tunisia; Clay $15,000; Singles and doubles draws	(Austria) Michael Linzer; 6–2, 6–3	(France) Thomas Bréchemier	(Portugal) Gonçalo Oliveira (Colombia) Cristian Rodríguez	(France) Jonathan Linzer (Germany) Paul Wörner (Italy) Nicolò Turchetti (Belgium) Christopher Heyman
May 8	Tunisia F18 Futures; Hammamet, Tunisia; Clay $15,000; Singles and doubles draws	(France) Yannick Jankovits (France) Jonathan Kanar; 6–3, 6–4	(Tunisia) Anis Ghorbel (Colombia) Cristian Rodríguez	(Portugal) Gonçalo Oliveira (Colombia) Cristian Rodríguez	(France) Jonathan Linzer (Germany) Paul Wörner (Italy) Nicolò Turchetti (Belgium) Christopher Heyman
May 8	Turkey F18 Futures; Antalya, Turkey; Clay $15,000; Singles and doubles draws	(Austria) Dennis Novak; 6–4, 6–4	(Germany) Marc Sieber	(France) Gleb Sakharov (United Kingdom) Ryan James Storrie	(Bosnia and Herzegovina) Nerman Fatić (United States) Maksim Tikhomirov (Brazil) Bruno Sant'Anna (Czech Republic) Robin Staněk
May 8	Turkey F18 Futures; Antalya, Turkey; Clay $15,000; Singles and doubles draws	(Austria) Dennis Novak (Austria) Thomas Statzberger; 6–0, 2–6, [14–12]	(United Kingdom) Joel Cannell (United Kingdom) Ryan James Storrie	(France) Gleb Sakharov (United Kingdom) Ryan James Storrie	(Bosnia and Herzegovina) Nerman Fatić (United States) Maksim Tikhomirov (Brazil) Bruno Sant'Anna (Czech Republic) Robin Staněk
May 8	Ukraine F1 Futures; Cherkasy, Ukraine; Clay $15,000; Singles and doubles draws	(Portugal) Frederico Ferreira Silva; 6–1, 6–2	(Ukraine) Artem Smirnov	(Russia) Ivan Nedelko (Czech Republic) Jaroslav Pospíšil	(Ukraine) Danylo Kalenichenko (Ukraine) Alexander Lebedyn (Slovakia) Filip Horanský (Italy) Alessandro Petrone
May 8	Ukraine F1 Futures; Cherkasy, Ukraine; Clay $15,000; Singles and doubles draws	(Italy) Riccardo Bonadio (Italy) Pietro Rondoni; 6–2, 7–5	(Ukraine) Vladyslav Orlov (Georgia (country)) George Tsivadze	(Russia) Ivan Nedelko (Czech Republic) Jaroslav Pospíšil	(Ukraine) Danylo Kalenichenko (Ukraine) Alexander Lebedyn (Slovakia) Filip Horanský (Italy) Alessandro Petrone
May 15	China F7 Futures; Wuhan, China; Hard $25,000; Singles and doubles draws	(Australia) Dayne Kelly; 7–6^{(7–4)}, 7–6^{(8–6)}	(United States) Marcos Giron	(China) Wang Chuhan (Australia) Harry Bourchier	(Japan) Naoki Nakagawa (Japan) Shintaro Imai (New Zealand) José Statham (China) Sun Fajing
May 15	China F7 Futures; Wuhan, China; Hard $25,000; Singles and doubles draws	(Japan) Shintaro Imai (Japan) Kaichi Uchida; 4–6, 6–4, [10–8]	(China) Gao Xin (China) Li Zhe	(China) Wang Chuhan (Australia) Harry Bourchier	(Japan) Naoki Nakagawa (Japan) Shintaro Imai (New Zealand) José Statham (China) Sun Fajing
May 15	Nigeria F3 Futures; Abuja, Nigeria; Hard $25,000; Singles and doubles draws	(France) Calvin Hemery; 6–7^{(2–7)}, 6–3, 6–1	(Guatemala) Christopher Díaz Figueroa	(Serbia) Peđa Krstin (Canada) Brayden Schnur	(India) Haadin Bava (Zimbabwe) Takanyi Garanganga (Italy) Alessandro Bega (Tunisia) Moez Echargui
May 15	Nigeria F3 Futures; Abuja, Nigeria; Hard $25,000; Singles and doubles draws	(Brazil) Fabiano de Paula (Brazil) Fernando Romboli; 3–6, 6–3, [16–14]	(Tunisia) Moez Echargui (Zimbabwe) Mark Fynn	(Serbia) Peđa Krstin (Canada) Brayden Schnur	(India) Haadin Bava (Zimbabwe) Takanyi Garanganga (Italy) Alessandro Bega (Tunisia) Moez Echargui
May 15	Sweden F2 Futures; Båstad, Sweden; Clay $25,000; Singles and doubles draws	(Bolivia) Hugo Dellien; 6–4, 5–7, 6–2	(Belgium) Yannick Vandenbulcke	(Sweden) Christian Lindell (Sweden) Jonathan Mridha	(Japan) Ryusei Makiguchi (Spain) Mario Vilella Martínez (Australia) Blake Mott (Sweden) Markus Eriksson
May 15	Sweden F2 Futures; Båstad, Sweden; Clay $25,000; Singles and doubles draws	(Sweden) Isak Arvidsson (Sweden) Fred Simonsson; 6–3, 3–6, [10–8]	(Portugal) Fred Gil (Spain) Mario Vilella Martínez	(Sweden) Christian Lindell (Sweden) Jonathan Mridha	(Japan) Ryusei Makiguchi (Spain) Mario Vilella Martínez (Australia) Blake Mott (Sweden) Markus Eriksson
May 15	Czech Republic F1 Futures; Prague, Czech Republic; Clay $15,000; Singles and doubles draws	(Germany) Julian Lenz; 6–2, 6–3	(Slovakia) Juraj Masár	(Belgium) Michael Geerts (Poland) Maciej Rajski	(Germany) Adrian Obert (Russia) Pavel Kotov (Chile) Laslo Urrutia Fuentes (Russia) Aleksandr Vasilenko
May 15	Czech Republic F1 Futures; Prague, Czech Republic; Clay $15,000; Singles and doubles draws	(Czech Republic) Dominik Kellovský (Bulgaria) Alexandar Lazarov; 6–1, 6–3	(Czech Republic) Daniel Pátý (Czech Republic) Jan Valenta	(Belgium) Michael Geerts (Poland) Maciej Rajski	(Germany) Adrian Obert (Russia) Pavel Kotov (Chile) Laslo Urrutia Fuentes (Russia) Aleksandr Vasilenko
May 15	Hungary F2 Futures; Zamárdi, Hungary; Clay $15,000; Singles and doubles draws	(Spain) Nicola Kuhn; 6–4, 6–0	(Hungary) Attila Balázs	(Hungary) Péter Nagy (Austria) Pascal Brunner	(Ukraine) Denys Mylokostov (Croatia) Nino Serdarušić (North Macedonia) Tomislav Jotovski (Hungary) Zsombor Piros
May 15	Hungary F2 Futures; Zamárdi, Hungary; Clay $15,000; Singles and doubles draws	(Austria) Pascal Brunner (Austria) David Pichler; 7–5, 6–4	(Croatia) Domagoj Bilješko (Croatia) Nino Serdarušić	(Hungary) Péter Nagy (Austria) Pascal Brunner	(Ukraine) Denys Mylokostov (Croatia) Nino Serdarušić (North Macedonia) Tomislav Jotovski (Hungary) Zsombor Piros
May 15	Israel F7 Futures; Herzliya, Israel; Hard $15,000; Singles and doubles draws	(Canada) Filip Peliwo; 4–6, 6–1, 7–6^{(7–5)}	(Israel) Edan Leshem	(United States) Peter Kobelt (Israel) Igor Smilansky	(Switzerland) Antoine Bellier (France) Baptiste Crepatte (Czech Republic) Michal Konečný (Israel) Ben Patael
May 15	Israel F7 Futures; Herzliya, Israel; Hard $15,000; Singles and doubles draws	(Switzerland) Antoine Bellier (France) Albano Olivetti; 7–6^{(7–1)}, 6–4	(Israel) Dekel Bar (Argentina) Matías Franco Descotte	(United States) Peter Kobelt (Israel) Igor Smilansky	(Switzerland) Antoine Bellier (France) Baptiste Crepatte (Czech Republic) Michal Konečný (Israel) Ben Patael
May 15	Italy F13 Futures; Vigevano, Italy; Clay $15,000; Singles and doubles draws	(Argentina) Andrea Collarini; 6–4, 6–1	(France) Gianni Mina	(Argentina) Hernán Casanova (Italy) Walter Trusendi	(Italy) Adelchi Virgili (Bosnia and Herzegovina) Tomislav Brkić (Italy) Enrico Dalla Valle (Italy) Gianluca Di Nicola
May 15	Italy F13 Futures; Vigevano, Italy; Clay $15,000; Singles and doubles draws	(Argentina) Franco Agamenone (Argentina) Andrea Collarini; 6–4, 6–3	(Austria) Sebastian Bader (United States) Hunter Reese	(Argentina) Hernán Casanova (Italy) Walter Trusendi	(Italy) Adelchi Virgili (Bosnia and Herzegovina) Tomislav Brkić (Italy) Enrico Dalla Valle (Italy) Gianluca Di Nicola
May 15	Mexico F4 Futures; Pachuca, Mexico; Hard $15,000; Singles and doubles draws	(Uruguay) Marcel Felder; 3–6, 6–4, 6–4	(Mexico) Manuel Sánchez	(South Africa) Nicolaas Scholtz (Argentina) Juan Ignacio Londero	(United States) Adam El Mihdawy (Peru) Jorge Panta (Canada) Samuel Monette (Mexico) José Antonio Rodríguez Rodríguez
May 15	Mexico F4 Futures; Pachuca, Mexico; Hard $15,000; Singles and doubles draws	(Mexico) Manuel Sánchez (Bolivia) Federico Zeballos; 7–6^{(7–3)}, 6–2	(Philippines) Ruben Gonzales (South Africa) Nicolaas Scholtz	(South Africa) Nicolaas Scholtz (Argentina) Juan Ignacio Londero	(United States) Adam El Mihdawy (Peru) Jorge Panta (Canada) Samuel Monette (Mexico) José Antonio Rodríguez Rodríguez
May 15	Romania F1 Futures; Bucharest, Romania; Clay $15,000; Singles and doubles draws	(Romania) Nicolae Frunză; 6–3, 6–3	(United States) Sam Riffice	(Belgium) Yannick Mertens (Spain) Carlos Gómez-Herrera	(United States) Gianni Ross (Romania) Petru-Alexandru Luncanu (Slovakia) Filip Horanský (Romania) Dragoș Dima
May 15	Romania F1 Futures; Bucharest, Romania; Clay $15,000; Singles and doubles draws	(Belgium) Sander Gillé (Belgium) Joran Vliegen; 7–6^{(7–5)}, 6–2	(Romania) Andrei Ștefan Apostol (Romania) Nicolae Frunză	(Belgium) Yannick Mertens (Spain) Carlos Gómez-Herrera	(United States) Gianni Ross (Romania) Petru-Alexandru Luncanu (Slovakia) Filip Horanský (Romania) Dragoș Dima
May 15	Spain F14 Futures; Vic, Spain; Clay $15,000; Singles and doubles draws	(Brazil) Rafael Matos; 4–6, 6–0, 1–0 retired	(Argentina) Pedro Cachin	(Spain) Pol Toledo Bagué (Portugal) João Monteiro	(Spain) Sergio Gutiérrez Ferrol (Spain) Marcos Giraldi Requena (Brazil) Daniel Dutra da Silva (Spain) Jaume Munar
May 15	Spain F14 Futures; Vic, Spain; Clay $15,000; Singles and doubles draws	(Brazil) Igor Marcondes (Brazil) Rafael Matos; 7–6^{(8–6)}, 3–6, [10–6]	(Spain) Sergio Gutiérrez Ferrol (Brazil) Felipe Meligeni Alves	(Spain) Pol Toledo Bagué (Portugal) João Monteiro	(Spain) Sergio Gutiérrez Ferrol (Spain) Marcos Giraldi Requena (Brazil) Daniel Dutra da Silva (Spain) Jaume Munar
May 15	Tunisia F19 Futures; Hammamet, Tunisia; Clay $15,000; Singles and doubles draws	(Argentina) Mariano Kestelboim; 6–2, 6–1	(Spain) Miguel Semmler	(Portugal) Gonçalo Oliveira (Argentina) Juan Ignacio Galarza	(Italy) Cristian Carli (France) Florent Diep (Ecuador) Diego Hidalgo (Belgium) Christopher Heyman
May 15	Tunisia F19 Futures; Hammamet, Tunisia; Clay $15,000; Singles and doubles draws	(Argentina) Mariano Kestelboim (Portugal) Gonçalo Oliveira; 6–0, 6–1	(Italy) Cristian Carli (Italy) Nicolò Turchetti	(Portugal) Gonçalo Oliveira (Argentina) Juan Ignacio Galarza	(Italy) Cristian Carli (France) Florent Diep (Ecuador) Diego Hidalgo (Belgium) Christopher Heyman
May 15	Turkey F19 Futures; Antalya, Turkey; Clay $15,000; Singles and doubles draws	(Austria) Thomas Statzberger; 6–4, 5–7, 6–2	(Germany) Sebastian Prechtel	(South Africa) Lloyd Harris (France) Jules Okala	(Monaco) Lucas Catarina (France) Alexis Musialek (Russia) Ivan Davydov (Austria) Jonas Trinker
May 15	Turkey F19 Futures; Antalya, Turkey; Clay $15,000; Singles and doubles draws	(United Kingdom) Joel Cannell (Argentina) Manuel Peña López; 6–1, 4–6, [10–5]	(Republic of Ireland) Peter Bothwell (Republic of Ireland) Samuel Bothwell	(South Africa) Lloyd Harris (France) Jules Okala	(Monaco) Lucas Catarina (France) Alexis Musialek (Russia) Ivan Davydov (Austria) Jonas Trinker
May 15	Ukraine F2 Futures; Cherkasy, Ukraine; Clay $15,000; Singles and doubles draws	(Italy) Riccardo Bonadio; 6–3, 6–1	(Spain) Carlos Boluda-Purkiss	(Poland) Kamil Majchrzak (Italy) Pietro Rondoni	(Ukraine) Marat Deviatiarov (Czech Republic) Jaroslav Pospíšil (Brazil) Wilson Leite (Switzerland) Riccardo Maiga
May 15	Ukraine F2 Futures; Cherkasy, Ukraine; Clay $15,000; Singles and doubles draws	(Italy) Riccardo Bonadio (Italy) Pietro Rondoni; 4–6, 6–1, [10–7]	(Ukraine) Oleksandr Bielinskyi (Ukraine) Danylo Kalenichenko	(Poland) Kamil Majchrzak (Italy) Pietro Rondoni	(Ukraine) Marat Deviatiarov (Czech Republic) Jaroslav Pospíšil (Brazil) Wilson Leite (Switzerland) Riccardo Maiga
May 22	China F8 Futures; Fuzhou, China; Hard $25,000; Singles and doubles draws	(United States) Marcos Giron; 7–5, 6–4	(United States) Alexander Sarkissian	(China) Li Zhe (New Zealand) José Statham	(China) Gao Xin (New Zealand) Finn Tearney (Japan) Takuto Niki (Japan) Kaichi Uchida
May 22	China F8 Futures; Fuzhou, China; Hard $25,000; Singles and doubles draws	(China) Sun Fajing (China) Te Rigele; 6–2, 6–4	(United States) Alexander Sarkissian (New Zealand) Finn Tearney	(China) Li Zhe (New Zealand) José Statham	(China) Gao Xin (New Zealand) Finn Tearney (Japan) Takuto Niki (Japan) Kaichi Uchida
May 22	Romania F2 Futures; Bacău, Romania; Clay $25,000; Singles and doubles draws	(Portugal) Gonçalo Oliveira; 3–6, 6–3, 6–0	(India) Sumit Nagal	(Portugal) Frederico Ferreira Silva (Italy) Marco Bortolotti	(France) Grégoire Jacq (Argentina) Facundo Mena (Italy) Tommaso Gabrieli (France) Gianni Mina
May 22	Romania F2 Futures; Bacău, Romania; Clay $25,000; Singles and doubles draws	(Portugal) Frederico Ferreira Silva (Spain) David Vega Hernández; 7–5, 6–3	(Romania) Vasile Antonescu (Romania) Patrick Grigoriu	(Portugal) Frederico Ferreira Silva (Italy) Marco Bortolotti	(France) Grégoire Jacq (Argentina) Facundo Mena (Italy) Tommaso Gabrieli (France) Gianni Mina
May 22	Bosnia & Herzegovina F1 Futures; Doboj, Bosnia and Herzegovina; Clay $15,000; Singles and doubles draws	(Italy) Fabrizio Ornago; 3–1 retired	(Croatia) Nino Serdarušić	(North Macedonia) Tomislav Jotovski (Argentina) Franco Agamenone	(Montenegro) Ljubomir Čelebić (Germany) Elmar Ejupovic (Poland) Maciej Rajski (Croatia) Joško Topić
May 22	Bosnia & Herzegovina F1 Futures; Doboj, Bosnia and Herzegovina; Clay $15,000; Singles and doubles draws	(Argentina) Franco Agamenone (Brazil) Thales Turini; 6–3, 6–2	(North Macedonia) Tomislav Jotovski (Serbia) Milan Radojković	(North Macedonia) Tomislav Jotovski (Argentina) Franco Agamenone	(Montenegro) Ljubomir Čelebić (Germany) Elmar Ejupovic (Poland) Maciej Rajski (Croatia) Joško Topić
May 22	Czech Republic F2 Futures; Most, Czech Republic; Clay $15,000; Singles and doubles draws	(Germany) Julian Lenz; 4–6, 6–2, 6–2	(Czech Republic) Jan Mertl	(Russia) Aleksandr Vasilenko (Germany) Johannes Härteis	(Bulgaria) Alexandar Lazarov (Germany) Paul Wörner (Germany) Florian Fallert (Poland) Piotr Matuszewski
May 22	Czech Republic F2 Futures; Most, Czech Republic; Clay $15,000; Singles and doubles draws	(Czech Republic) Dominik Kellovský (Poland) Grzegorz Panfil; 6–3, 6–2	(Czech Republic) Tomáš Papík (Czech Republic) Matěj Vocel	(Russia) Aleksandr Vasilenko (Germany) Johannes Härteis	(Bulgaria) Alexandar Lazarov (Germany) Paul Wörner (Germany) Florian Fallert (Poland) Piotr Matuszewski
May 22	Hungary F3 Futures; Balatonalmádi, Hungary; Clay $15,000; Singles and doubles draws	(Germany) Pascal Meis; 6–3, 6–4	(Slovakia) Filip Horanský	(Hungary) Zsombor Piros (Hungary) Gábor Borsos	(Czech Republic) Petr Hájek (Spain) Pol Toledo Bagué (Austria) Thomas Statzberger (Spain) Nicola Kuhn
May 22	Hungary F3 Futures; Balatonalmádi, Hungary; Clay $15,000; Singles and doubles draws	(Hungary) Gábor Borsos (Hungary) Viktor Filipenkó; 6–3, 6–4	(Hungary) Levente Gödry (Hungary) Péter Nagy	(Hungary) Zsombor Piros (Hungary) Gábor Borsos	(Czech Republic) Petr Hájek (Spain) Pol Toledo Bagué (Austria) Thomas Statzberger (Spain) Nicola Kuhn
May 22	Israel F8 Futures; Netanya, Israel; Hard $15,000; Singles and doubles draws	(Canada) Filip Peliwo; 6–3, 7–5	(Israel) Dekel Bar	(France) Albano Olivetti (Israel) Mor Bulis	(Israel) Jordan Hasson (Israel) Shahar Elbaz (France) Sébastien Boltz (France) Yanais Laurent
May 22	Israel F8 Futures; Netanya, Israel; Hard $15,000; Singles and doubles draws	(Switzerland) Antoine Bellier (France) Albano Olivetti; 7–6^{(8–6)}, 7–5	(France) Yanais Laurent (Canada) Filip Peliwo	(France) Albano Olivetti (Israel) Mor Bulis	(Israel) Jordan Hasson (Israel) Shahar Elbaz (France) Sébastien Boltz (France) Yanais Laurent
May 22	Italy F14 Futures; Frascati, Italy; Clay $15,000; Singles and doubles draws	(Ecuador) Gonzalo Escobar; 6–1, 6–2	(Croatia) Viktor Galović	(Australia) Alex Bolt (Italy) Adelchi Virgili	(Argentina) Andrea Collarini (Italy) Andrea Vavassori (Russia) Alen Avidzba (Italy) Riccardo Balzerani
May 22	Italy F14 Futures; Frascati, Italy; Clay $15,000; Singles and doubles draws	(Australia) Alex Bolt (Australia) Jason Kubler; 6–1, 7–6^{(8–6)}	(Italy) Federico Maccari (Italy) Andrea Vavassori	(Australia) Alex Bolt (Italy) Adelchi Virgili	(Argentina) Andrea Collarini (Italy) Andrea Vavassori (Russia) Alen Avidzba (Italy) Riccardo Balzerani
May 22	Singapore F1 Futures; Singapore; Hard $15,000; Singles and doubles draws	(Japan) Hiroyasu Ehara; 6–3, 6–3	(Australia) Dayne Kelly	(Vietnam) Lý Hoàng Nam (Thailand) Wishaya Trongcharoenchaikul	(Australia) Thomas Fancutt (India) Vijay Sundar Prashanth (Japan) Sho Katayama (Japan) Kento Takeuchi
May 22	Singapore F1 Futures; Singapore; Hard $15,000; Singles and doubles draws	(Philippines) Francis Casey Alcantara (Netherlands) Sem Verbeek; 6–3, 6–2	(Japan) Hiroyasu Ehara (Japan) Sho Katayama	(Vietnam) Lý Hoàng Nam (Thailand) Wishaya Trongcharoenchaikul	(Australia) Thomas Fancutt (India) Vijay Sundar Prashanth (Japan) Sho Katayama (Japan) Kento Takeuchi
May 22	Spain F15 Futures; Santa Margarida de Montbui, Spain; Hard $15,000; Singles and doubles draws	(Portugal) João Monteiro; 7–6^{(7–5)}, 7–5	(Spain) Jaume Munar	(Portugal) Francisco Cabral (France) David Guez	(Spain) Jaume Pla Malfeito (France) Yannick Jankovits (Brazil) Caio Silva (Germany) Sami Reinwein
May 22	Spain F15 Futures; Santa Margarida de Montbui, Spain; Hard $15,000; Singles and doubles draws	(Portugal) Nuno Deus (Portugal) João Monteiro; 6–3, 3–6, [10–7]	(Italy) Erik Crepaldi (Zimbabwe) Benjamin Lock	(Portugal) Francisco Cabral (France) David Guez	(Spain) Jaume Pla Malfeito (France) Yannick Jankovits (Brazil) Caio Silva (Germany) Sami Reinwein
May 22	Tunisia F20 Futures; Hammamet, Tunisia; Clay $15,000; Singles and doubles draws	(Portugal) André Gaspar Murta; 6–3, 3–6, 6–4	(Argentina) Mariano Kestelboim	(Tunisia) Anis Ghorbel (France) Louis Chaix	(France) Louis Tessa (Russia) Mikhail Korovin (Ecuador) Diego Hidalgo (Italy) Filippo Baldi
May 22	Tunisia F20 Futures; Hammamet, Tunisia; Clay $15,000; Singles and doubles draws	(Bolivia) Boris Arias (Ecuador) Diego Hidalgo; 7–5, 6–3	(Portugal) André Gaspar Murta (Tunisia) Anis Ghorbel	(Tunisia) Anis Ghorbel (France) Louis Chaix	(France) Louis Tessa (Russia) Mikhail Korovin (Ecuador) Diego Hidalgo (Italy) Filippo Baldi
May 22	Turkey F20 Futures; Antalya, Turkey; Clay $15,000; Singles and doubles draws	(Serbia) Miomir Kecmanović; 6–0, 6–4	(Italy) Alessandro Petrone	(Poland) Maciej Smoła (Canada) Pavel Krainik	(Argentina) Juan Martín (Croatia) Duje Kekez (Germany) Mats Rosenkranz (France) Alexis Musialek
May 22	Turkey F20 Futures; Antalya, Turkey; Clay $15,000; Singles and doubles draws	(Spain) Sergio Martos Gornés (Spain) David Pérez Sanz; 7–5, 6–4	(Bolivia) Hugo Dellien (Lithuania) Julius Tverijonas	(Poland) Maciej Smoła (Canada) Pavel Krainik	(Argentina) Juan Martín (Croatia) Duje Kekez (Germany) Mats Rosenkranz (France) Alexis Musialek
May 22	Ukraine F3 Futures; Cherkasy, Ukraine; Clay $15,000; Singles and doubles draws	(Ukraine) Denys Mylokostov; 6–1, 4–6, 6–1	(Spain) Carlos Boluda-Purkiss	(Ukraine) Olexiy Kolisnyk (Brazil) Jordan Correia	(Ukraine) Marat Deviatiarov (Chile) Michel Vernier (Brazil) Wilson Leite (France) Thomas Bréchemier
May 22	Ukraine F3 Futures; Cherkasy, Ukraine; Clay $15,000; Singles and doubles draws	(Spain) Carlos Boluda-Purkiss (Brazil) Jordan Correia; 7–5, 6–4	(Ukraine) Olexiy Kolisnyk (Ukraine) Oleg Prihodko	(Ukraine) Olexiy Kolisnyk (Brazil) Jordan Correia	(Ukraine) Marat Deviatiarov (Chile) Michel Vernier (Brazil) Wilson Leite (France) Thomas Bréchemier
May 29	China F9 Futures; Lu'an, China; Hard $25,000; Singles and doubles draws	(United States) Alexander Sarkissian; 6–2, 6–1	(China) Zhang Zhizhen	(China) Wu Di (New Zealand) José Statham	(Latvia) Mārtiņš Podžus (United States) Marcos Giron (New Zealand) Finn Tearney (Japan) Naoki Nakagawa
May 29	China F9 Futures; Lu'an, China; Hard $25,000; Singles and doubles draws	(Australia) Harry Bourchier (Japan) Kaichi Uchida; 6–3, 7–5	(Chinese Taipei) Lo Chien-hsun (China) Zhou Shenghao	(China) Wu Di (New Zealand) José Statham	(Latvia) Mārtiņš Podžus (United States) Marcos Giron (New Zealand) Finn Tearney (Japan) Naoki Nakagawa
May 29	Japan F6 Futures; Karuizawa, Japan; Clay $25,000; Singles and doubles draws	(Japan) Yusuke Takahashi; 6–2, 6–2	(Japan) Shintaro Imai	(Japan) Sora Fukuda (Japan) Renta Tokuda	(Japan) Takuto Niki (Japan) Kento Takeuchi (Japan) Sho Shimabukuro (Japan) Gengo Kikuchi
May 29	Japan F6 Futures; Karuizawa, Japan; Clay $25,000; Singles and doubles draws	(Japan) Toshihide Matsui (Indonesia) Christopher Rungkat; 7–5, 6–2	(Japan) Shintaro Imai (Japan) Takuto Niki	(Japan) Sora Fukuda (Japan) Renta Tokuda	(Japan) Takuto Niki (Japan) Kento Takeuchi (Japan) Sho Shimabukuro (Japan) Gengo Kikuchi
May 29	Uzbekistan F3 Futures; Andijan, Uzbekistan; Hard $25,000; Singles and doubles draws	(Uzbekistan) Sanjar Fayziev; 6–3, 6–3	(India) Sriram Balaji	(Belarus) Dzmitry Zhyrmont (Russia) Vitaly Kozyukov	(Uzbekistan) Pavel Tsoy (Uzbekistan) Temur Ismailov (Ukraine) Vladyslav Manafov (Kyrgyzstan) Daniiar Duldaev
May 29	Uzbekistan F3 Futures; Andijan, Uzbekistan; Hard $25,000; Singles and doubles draws	(India) Sriram Balaji (India) Vishnu Vardhan; 6–3, 6–2	(Ukraine) Vladyslav Manafov (Russia) Denis Matsukevich	(Belarus) Dzmitry Zhyrmont (Russia) Vitaly Kozyukov	(Uzbekistan) Pavel Tsoy (Uzbekistan) Temur Ismailov (Ukraine) Vladyslav Manafov (Kyrgyzstan) Daniiar Duldaev
May 29	Bosnia & Herzegovina F2 Futures; Brčko, Bosnia and Herzegovina; Clay $15,000; Singles and doubles draws	(Bosnia and Herzegovina) Tomislav Brkić; 7–6^{(9–7)}, 6–3	(United States) Evan King	(Austria) David Pichler (Argentina) Franco Agamenone	(Serbia) Miljan Zekić (Russia) Kirill Dmitriev (North Macedonia) Tomislav Jotovski (Greece) Ioannis Stergiou
May 29	Bosnia & Herzegovina F2 Futures; Brčko, Bosnia and Herzegovina; Clay $15,000; Singles and doubles draws	(Australia) Adam Taylor (Australia) Jason Taylor; 7–6^{(7–3)}, 6–1	(Argentina) Franco Agamenone (Mexico) Lucas Gómez	(Austria) David Pichler (Argentina) Franco Agamenone	(Serbia) Miljan Zekić (Russia) Kirill Dmitriev (North Macedonia) Tomislav Jotovski (Greece) Ioannis Stergiou
May 29	Czech Republic F3 Futures; Jablonec nad Nisou, Czech Republic; Clay $15,000; Singles and doubles draws	(Brazil) Bruno Sant'Anna; 6–1, 6–4	(Czech Republic) Jan Mertl	(Germany) Jan Choinski (Poland) Kamil Majchrzak	(Czech Republic) Petr Michnev (Germany) Pascal Meis (Switzerland) Adrien Bossel (Czech Republic) Matěj Vocel
May 29	Czech Republic F3 Futures; Jablonec nad Nisou, Czech Republic; Clay $15,000; Singles and doubles draws	(Germany) Jan Choinski (Poland) Kamil Majchrzak; 7–6^{(7–4)}, 6–3	(Czech Republic) Petr Michnev (Czech Republic) Matěj Vocel	(Germany) Jan Choinski (Poland) Kamil Majchrzak	(Czech Republic) Petr Michnev (Germany) Pascal Meis (Switzerland) Adrien Bossel (Czech Republic) Matěj Vocel
May 29	Italy F15 Futures; Reggio Emilia, Italy; Clay $15,000; Singles and doubles draws	(Germany) Yannick Maden; 6–4, 4–6, 6–1	(France) Gianni Mina	(Austria) Michael Linzer (Croatia) Ante Pavić	(Czech Republic) Václav Šafránek (Argentina) Andrea Collarini (Italy) Roberto Marcora (Czech Republic) Zdeněk Kolář
May 29	Italy F15 Futures; Reggio Emilia, Italy; Clay $15,000; Singles and doubles draws	(Poland) Grzegorz Panfil (Croatia) Ante Pavić; 6–1, 7–6^{(7–4)}	(United States) Alexander Centenari (Ecuador) Gonzalo Escobar	(Austria) Michael Linzer (Croatia) Ante Pavić	(Czech Republic) Václav Šafránek (Argentina) Andrea Collarini (Italy) Roberto Marcora (Czech Republic) Zdeněk Kolář
May 29	Korea F1 Futures; Sangju, South Korea; Hard $15,000; Singles and doubles draws	(United States) Daniel Nguyen; 6–4, 5–7, 6–2	(South Korea) Hong Seong-chan	(South Korea) Kim Cheong-eui (Japan) Makoto Ochi	(South Korea) Kim Jae-hwan (South Korea) Chung Hong (South Korea) Noh Sang-woo (South Korea) Oh Chan-yeong
May 29	Korea F1 Futures; Sangju, South Korea; Hard $15,000; Singles and doubles draws	(South Korea) Chung Hong (South Korea) Lee Jea-moon; 6–0, 6–0	(Chinese Taipei) Hung Jui-chen (United States) Daniel Nguyen	(South Korea) Kim Cheong-eui (Japan) Makoto Ochi	(South Korea) Kim Jae-hwan (South Korea) Chung Hong (South Korea) Noh Sang-woo (South Korea) Oh Chan-yeong
May 29	Singapore F2 Futures; Singapore; Hard $15,000; Singles and doubles draws	(India) Ramkumar Ramanathan; 6–2, 6–2	(United States) Raymond Sarmiento	(India) Vijay Sundar Prashanth (Australia) Dayne Kelly	(India) Sidharth Rawat (Japan) Masato Shiga (United States) Nicholas Hu (Philippines) Francis Casey Alcantara
May 29	Singapore F2 Futures; Singapore; Hard $15,000; Singles and doubles draws	(Philippines) Francis Casey Alcantara (Netherlands) Sem Verbeek; 6–3, 6–4	(Japan) Soichiro Moritani (Japan) Masato Shiga	(India) Vijay Sundar Prashanth (Australia) Dayne Kelly	(India) Sidharth Rawat (Japan) Masato Shiga (United States) Nicholas Hu (Philippines) Francis Casey Alcantara
May 29	Tunisia F21 Futures; Hammamet, Tunisia; Clay $15,000; Singles and doubles draws	(Colombia) Cristian Rodríguez; 7–5, 6–4	(France) Elliot Benchetrit	(Brazil) Pedro Sakamoto (France) Thomas Bréchemier	(Belgium) Clément Geens (Italy) Riccardo Bonadio (Argentina) Mariano Kestelboim (Morocco) Amine Ahouda
May 29	Tunisia F21 Futures; Hammamet, Tunisia; Clay $15,000; Singles and doubles draws	(Italy) Riccardo Bonadio (Italy) Riccardo Sinicropi; 7–6^{(7–4)}, 6–0	(Brazil) Pedro Sakamoto (Chile) Alejandro Tabilo	(Brazil) Pedro Sakamoto (France) Thomas Bréchemier	(Belgium) Clément Geens (Italy) Riccardo Bonadio (Argentina) Mariano Kestelboim (Morocco) Amine Ahouda
May 29	Turkey F21 Futures; Antalya, Turkey; Clay $15,000; Singles and doubles draws	(Belgium) Julien Cagnina; 6–3, 6–4	(Serbia) Miomir Kecmanović	(Spain) Roberto Ortega Olmedo (Russia) Ivan Nedelko	(South Africa) Lloyd Harris (Spain) Sergio Martos Gornés (Germany) Christoph Negritu (Russia) Ivan Gakhov
May 29	Turkey F21 Futures; Antalya, Turkey; Clay $15,000; Singles and doubles draws	(Venezuela) Jordi Muñoz Abreu (Spain) David Pérez Sanz; 6–4, 6–3	(Brazil) Ricardo Hocevar (Chile) Juan Carlos Sáez	(Spain) Roberto Ortega Olmedo (Russia) Ivan Nedelko	(South Africa) Lloyd Harris (Spain) Sergio Martos Gornés (Germany) Christoph Negritu (Russia) Ivan Gakhov

=== June ===
Week of	Tournament	Winner	Runners-up	Semifinalists	Quarterfinalists
June 5	Spain F16 Futures; Huelva, Spain; Clay $25,000; Singles and doubles draws	(Hungary) Attila Balázs; 6–3, 1–6, 7–5	(Spain) Ricardo Ojeda Lara	(Spain) Pedro Martínez (Spain) Jaime Fermosell	(Spain) David Vega Hernández (Spain) Carlos Taberner (Dominican Republic) José Hernández-Fernández (Spain) Jordi Samper Montaña
June 5	Spain F16 Futures; Huelva, Spain; Clay $25,000; Singles and doubles draws	(Brazil) Pedro Bernardi (Brazil) Guilherme Clezar; 4–6, 6–4, [11–9]	(Mexico) Hans Hach Verdugo (United States) Alex Lawson	(Spain) Pedro Martínez (Spain) Jaime Fermosell	(Spain) David Vega Hernández (Spain) Carlos Taberner (Dominican Republic) José Hernández-Fernández (Spain) Jordi Samper Montaña
June 5	Uzbekistan F4 Futures; Namangan, Uzbekistan; Hard $25,000; Singles and doubles draws	(Belarus) Dzmitry Zhyrmont; 7–6^{(8–6)}, 6–3	(Russia) Mikhail Fufygin	(Uzbekistan) Sanjar Fayziev (India) Sriram Balaji	(Russia) Markos Kalovelonis (Egypt) Youssef Hossam (Uzbekistan) Temur Ismailov (India) Vishnu Vardhan
June 5	Uzbekistan F4 Futures; Namangan, Uzbekistan; Hard $25,000; Singles and doubles draws	(Ukraine) Vladyslav Manafov (Russia) Denis Matsukevich; 6–4, 6–7^{(7–9)}, [10–8]	(Uzbekistan) Sanjar Fayziev (Kazakhstan) Timur Khabibulin	(Uzbekistan) Sanjar Fayziev (India) Sriram Balaji	(Russia) Markos Kalovelonis (Egypt) Youssef Hossam (Uzbekistan) Temur Ismailov (India) Vishnu Vardhan
June 5	Argentina F1 Futures; Villa del Dique, Argentina; Clay $15,000; Singles and doubles draws	(Argentina) Tomás Lipovšek Puches; 6–2, 7–6^{(7–2)}	(Brazil) Oscar José Gutierrez	(Argentina) Hernán Casanova (Argentina) Juan Ignacio Galarza	(Argentina) Alan Kohen (Argentina) Camilo Ugo Carabelli (Brazil) Carlos Eduardo Severino (Peru) Juan Pablo Varillas
June 5	Argentina F1 Futures; Villa del Dique, Argentina; Clay $15,000; Singles and doubles draws	(Argentina) Facundo Argüello (Argentina) Tomás Lipovšek Puches; 6–0, 6–1	(Argentina) Hernán Casanova (Argentina) Juan Ignacio Galarza	(Argentina) Hernán Casanova (Argentina) Juan Ignacio Galarza	(Argentina) Alan Kohen (Argentina) Camilo Ugo Carabelli (Brazil) Carlos Eduardo Severino (Peru) Juan Pablo Varillas
June 5	Bosnia & Herzegovina F3 Futures; Kiseljak, Bosnia and Herzegovina; Clay $15,000; Singles and doubles draws	(Austria) David Pichler; 3–6, 6–3, 6–4	(Montenegro) Rrezart Cungu	(Bosnia and Herzegovina) Tomislav Brkić (United States) Evan King	(Argentina) Juan Pablo Paz (Italy) Erik Crepaldi (Russia) Evgeny Karlovskiy (Japan) Shunsuke Wakita
June 5	Bosnia & Herzegovina F3 Futures; Kiseljak, Bosnia and Herzegovina; Clay $15,000; Singles and doubles draws	(Bosnia and Herzegovina) Nerman Fatić (Croatia) Antun Vidak; 6–4, 2–6, [10–4]	(Italy) Erik Crepaldi (Mexico) Lucas Gómez	(Bosnia and Herzegovina) Tomislav Brkić (United States) Evan King	(Argentina) Juan Pablo Paz (Italy) Erik Crepaldi (Russia) Evgeny Karlovskiy (Japan) Shunsuke Wakita
June 5	Israel F9 Futures; Kiryat Shmona, Israel; Hard $15,000; Singles and doubles draws	(France) David Guez; 7–5, 7–5	(Republic of Ireland) Sam Barry	(Israel) Igor Smilansky (France) Antoine Escoffier	(Israel) Jordan Hasson (France) Mick Lescure (Israel) Mor Bulis (Spain) Javier Pulgar-García
June 5	Israel F9 Futures; Kiryat Shmona, Israel; Hard $15,000; Singles and doubles draws	(Israel) Alon Elia (France) Antoine Escoffier; 6–3, 7–6^{(7–5)}	(France) David Guez (France) Mick Lescure	(Israel) Igor Smilansky (France) Antoine Escoffier	(Israel) Jordan Hasson (France) Mick Lescure (Israel) Mor Bulis (Spain) Javier Pulgar-García
June 5	Italy F16 Futures; Padua, Italy; Clay $15,000; Singles and doubles draws	(Argentina) Andrea Collarini; 6–4, 6–4	(Brazil) Orlando Luz	(Australia) Maverick Banes (Austria) Michael Linzer	(Italy) Edoardo Eremin (Germany) Sebastian Fanselow (Germany) Peter Heller (Italy) Matteo Viola
June 5	Italy F16 Futures; Padua, Italy; Clay $15,000; Singles and doubles draws	(Italy) Julian Ocleppo (Italy) Andrea Vavassori; 4–6, 6–1, [10–8]	(Argentina) Franco Agamenone (Argentina) Facundo Mena	(Australia) Maverick Banes (Austria) Michael Linzer	(Italy) Edoardo Eremin (Germany) Sebastian Fanselow (Germany) Peter Heller (Italy) Matteo Viola
June 5	Japan F7 Futures; Tokyo, Japan; Hard $15,000; Singles and doubles draws	(Japan) Yosuke Watanuki; 4–6, 6–1, 6–4	(Japan) Kento Takeuchi	(Japan) Haru Inoue (Japan) Yusuke Takahashi	(Japan) Takuto Niki (Japan) Naoki Nakagawa (Japan) Sho Shimabukuro (Japan) Shuichi Sekiguchi
June 5	Japan F7 Futures; Tokyo, Japan; Hard $15,000; Singles and doubles draws	(Japan) Sora Fukuda (Japan) Masaki Sasai; 6–2, 1–6, [11–9]	(Japan) Yosuke Watanuki (Japan) Yusuke Watanuki	(Japan) Haru Inoue (Japan) Yusuke Takahashi	(Japan) Takuto Niki (Japan) Naoki Nakagawa (Japan) Sho Shimabukuro (Japan) Shuichi Sekiguchi
June 5	Korea F2 Futures; Gimcheon, South Korea; Hard $15,000; Singles and doubles draws	(United States) Daniel Nguyen; 6–3, 6–4	(South Korea) Lee Jea-moon	(South Korea) Song Min-kyu (South Korea) Kim Cheong-eui	(South Korea) Oh Chan-yeong (South Korea) Hong Seong-chan (South Korea) Sin Dong-hak (South Korea) Son Ji-hoon
June 5	Korea F2 Futures; Gimcheon, South Korea; Hard $15,000; Singles and doubles draws	(South Korea) Kim Hyun-joon (South Korea) Noh Sang-woo; 2–6, 6–1, [14–12]	(South Korea) Hong Seong-chan (South Korea) Kim Young-seok	(South Korea) Song Min-kyu (South Korea) Kim Cheong-eui	(South Korea) Oh Chan-yeong (South Korea) Hong Seong-chan (South Korea) Sin Dong-hak (South Korea) Son Ji-hoon
June 5	Singapore F3 Futures; Singapore; Hard $15,000; Singles and doubles draws	(India) Ramkumar Ramanathan; 7–6^{(7–4)}, 6–2	(United States) Nicholas Hu	(Vietnam) Lý Hoàng Nam (India) Vijay Sundar Prashanth	(Switzerland) Marc-Andrea Hüsler (Japan) Yuichi Ito (Australia) Jacob Grills (Denmark) Benjamin Hannestad
June 5	Singapore F3 Futures; Singapore; Hard $15,000; Singles and doubles draws	(Philippines) Francis Casey Alcantara (Netherlands) Sem Verbeek; 7–6^{(7–3)}, 6–2	(Japan) Yuichi Ito (Vietnam) Lý Hoàng Nam	(Vietnam) Lý Hoàng Nam (India) Vijay Sundar Prashanth	(Switzerland) Marc-Andrea Hüsler (Japan) Yuichi Ito (Australia) Jacob Grills (Denmark) Benjamin Hannestad
June 5	Thailand F1 Futures; Hua Hin, Thailand; Hard $15,000; Singles and doubles draws	(New Zealand) José Statham; 4–6, 6–1, 6–1	(New Zealand) Finn Tearney	(Australia) Harry Bourchier (Thailand) Pruchya Isaro	(Thailand) Wishaya Trongcharoenchaikul (India) Karunuday Singh (United States) Evan Song (Kazakhstan) Denis Yevseyev
June 5	Thailand F1 Futures; Hua Hin, Thailand; Hard $15,000; Singles and doubles draws	(Thailand) Nuttanon Kadchapanan (Thailand) Palaphoom Kovapitukted; 7–5, 7–5	(Thailand) Pruchya Isaro (Japan) Ryota Tanuma	(Australia) Harry Bourchier (Thailand) Pruchya Isaro	(Thailand) Wishaya Trongcharoenchaikul (India) Karunuday Singh (United States) Evan Song (Kazakhstan) Denis Yevseyev
June 5	Tunisia F22 Futures; Hammamet, Tunisia; Clay $15,000; Singles and doubles draws	(Portugal) Frederico Ferreira Silva; 6–4, 6–4	(Brazil) Fabiano de Paula	(Austria) Lenny Hampel (Portugal) Gonçalo Oliveira	(Austria) Lucas Miedler (France) Manuel Guinard (Tunisia) Moez Echargui (Italy) Riccardo Bonadio
June 5	Tunisia F22 Futures; Hammamet, Tunisia; Clay $15,000; Singles and doubles draws	(Tunisia) Aziz Dougaz (Tunisia) Skander Mansouri; 7–6^{(7–4)}, 6–1	(Tunisia) Moez Echargui (Portugal) Gonçalo Oliveira	(Austria) Lenny Hampel (Portugal) Gonçalo Oliveira	(Austria) Lucas Miedler (France) Manuel Guinard (Tunisia) Moez Echargui (Italy) Riccardo Bonadio
June 5	Turkey F22 Futures; Istanbul, Turkey; Clay $15,000; Singles and doubles draws	(Bolivia) Hugo Dellien; 6–2, 1–6, 6–2	(Spain) Mario Vilella Martínez	(Spain) Eduard Esteve Lobato (United Kingdom) Richard Gabb	(Chile) Cristóbal Saavedra Corvalán (Turkey) Altuğ Çelikbilek (Russia) Ivan Nedelko (Bulgaria) Dimitar Kuzmanov
June 5	Turkey F22 Futures; Istanbul, Turkey; Clay $15,000; Singles and doubles draws	(Bolivia) Hugo Dellien (Bolivia) Federico Zeballos; 6–4, 4–6, [10–3]	(Turkey) Sarp Ağabigün (Turkey) Altuğ Çelikbilek	(Spain) Eduard Esteve Lobato (United Kingdom) Richard Gabb	(Chile) Cristóbal Saavedra Corvalán (Turkey) Altuğ Çelikbilek (Russia) Ivan Nedelko (Bulgaria) Dimitar Kuzmanov
June 12	Chinese Taipei F1 Futures; Taipei, Chinese Taipei; Hard $25,000; Singles and doubles draws	(United States) Daniel Nguyen; 7–6^{(10–8)}, 6–1	(Japan) Yosuke Watanuki	(Japan) Yusuke Takahashi (Chinese Taipei) Wu Tung-lin	(United States) Tyler Lu (Japan) Shinta Fujii (United States) Nicholas Hu (Japan) Kento Takeuchi
June 12	Chinese Taipei F1 Futures; Taipei, Chinese Taipei; Hard $25,000; Singles and doubles draws	(Japan) Shintaro Imai (Japan) Takuto Niki; 7–5, 6–4	(Chinese Taipei) Lee Kuan-yi (Chinese Taipei) Liu Shao-fan	(Japan) Yusuke Takahashi (Chinese Taipei) Wu Tung-lin	(United States) Tyler Lu (Japan) Shinta Fujii (United States) Nicholas Hu (Japan) Kento Takeuchi
June 12	Hungary F4 Futures; Gyula, Hungary; Clay $25,000; Singles and doubles draws	(France) Constant Lestienne; 7–5, 6–4	(Argentina) Facundo Mena	(Argentina) Juan Pablo Paz (United States) Ulises Blanch	(Hungary) Máté Valkusz (Slovakia) Alex Molčan (Russia) Kirill Dmitriev (Czech Republic) Marek Jaloviec
June 12	Hungary F4 Futures; Gyula, Hungary; Clay $25,000; Singles and doubles draws	(Serbia) Nikola Ćaćić (Australia) Scott Puodziunas; 7–6^{(7–2)}, 6–2	(Hungary) Levente Gödry (Hungary) Péter Nagy	(Argentina) Juan Pablo Paz (United States) Ulises Blanch	(Hungary) Máté Valkusz (Slovakia) Alex Molčan (Russia) Kirill Dmitriev (Czech Republic) Marek Jaloviec
June 12	Turkey F23 Futures; Istanbul, Turkey; Clay $25,000; Singles and doubles draws	(Bolivia) Hugo Dellien; 6–3, 6–2	(France) Antoine Hoang	(Germany) Marc Sieber (Russia) Ivan Nedelko	(Bolivia) Federico Zeballos (United Kingdom) Richard Gabb (Bulgaria) Dimitar Kuzmanov (Spain) Mario Vilella Martínez
June 12	Turkey F23 Futures; Istanbul, Turkey; Clay $25,000; Singles and doubles draws	(Australia) Bradley Mousley (Spain) Mario Vilella Martínez; 6–3, 6–3	(Bolivia) Hugo Dellien (Bolivia) Federico Zeballos	(Germany) Marc Sieber (Russia) Ivan Nedelko	(Bolivia) Federico Zeballos (United Kingdom) Richard Gabb (Bulgaria) Dimitar Kuzmanov (Spain) Mario Vilella Martínez
June 12	USA F17 Futures; Winston-Salem, United States; Hard $25,000; Singles and doubles draws	(United States) Christopher Eubanks; 7–5, 2–6, 7–6^{(8–6)}	(United States) Kevin King	(Australia) Andrew Harris (United States) Wil Spencer	(United States) Jared Hiltzik (United States) Isaiah Strode (United States) Brandon Holt (United States) Jesse Witten
June 12	USA F17 Futures; Winston-Salem, United States; Hard $25,000; Singles and doubles draws	(United States) Brandon Holt (United States) Riley Smith; 7–6^{(7–4)}, 6–3	(United States) Christopher Eubanks (United States) Kevin King	(Australia) Andrew Harris (United States) Wil Spencer	(United States) Jared Hiltzik (United States) Isaiah Strode (United States) Brandon Holt (United States) Jesse Witten
June 12	Argentina F2 Futures; Córdoba, Argentina; Clay $15,000; Singles and doubles draws	(Argentina) Hernán Casanova; 7–5, 6–2	(Argentina) Juan Ignacio Galarza	(Brazil) André Miele (Argentina) Gonzalo Villanueva	(Brazil) Carlos Eduardo Severino (Argentina) Franco Emanuel Egea (Venezuela) David Souto (Argentina) Francisco Cerúndolo
June 12	Argentina F2 Futures; Córdoba, Argentina; Clay $15,000; Singles and doubles draws	(Argentina) Facundo Argüello (Argentina) Tomás Lipovšek Puches; 6–2, 6–2	(Brazil) André Miele (Brazil) Nicolas Santos	(Brazil) André Miele (Argentina) Gonzalo Villanueva	(Brazil) Carlos Eduardo Severino (Argentina) Franco Emanuel Egea (Venezuela) David Souto (Argentina) Francisco Cerúndolo
June 12	Israel F10 Futures; Kiryat Shmona, Israel; Hard $15,000; Singles and doubles draws	(France) Albano Olivetti; 6–3, 7–5	(France) David Guez	(Israel) Dekel Bar (Israel) Mor Bulis	(Israel) Ben Patael (Israel) Orel Ovil (France) Benjamin Pietri (United Kingdom) James Marsalek
June 12	Israel F10 Futures; Kiryat Shmona, Israel; Hard $15,000; Singles and doubles draws	(Israel) Dekel Bar (Israel) Mor Bulis; 7–5, 1–6, [10–6]	(France) Antoine Escoffier (France) Matthieu Roy	(Israel) Dekel Bar (Israel) Mor Bulis	(Israel) Ben Patael (Israel) Orel Ovil (France) Benjamin Pietri (United Kingdom) James Marsalek
June 12	Italy F17 Futures; Bergamo, Italy; Clay $15,000; Singles and doubles draws	(Argentina) Andrea Collarini; 6–2, 6–4	(Croatia) Viktor Galović	(Italy) Andrea Pellegrino (Romania) Vasile Antonescu	(Brazil) Orlando Luz (Argentina) Franco Agamenone (Switzerland) Alexander Ritschard (Italy) Giovanni Fonio
June 12	Italy F17 Futures; Bergamo, Italy; Clay $15,000; Singles and doubles draws	(Italy) Walter Trusendi (Italy) Andrea Vavassori; 6–1, 3–6, [13–11]	(Argentina) Franco Agamenone (Brazil) Fernando Romboli	(Italy) Andrea Pellegrino (Romania) Vasile Antonescu	(Brazil) Orlando Luz (Argentina) Franco Agamenone (Switzerland) Alexander Ritschard (Italy) Giovanni Fonio
June 12	Japan F8 Futures; Akishima, Japan; Carpet $15,000; Singles and doubles draws	(Japan) Sora Fukuda; 6–2, 6–3	(Japan) Yusuke Watanuki	(Japan) Hiroyasu Ehara (Japan) Yuki Mochizuki	(Japan) Koichi Sano (Japan) Gengo Kikuchi (Japan) Sho Shimabukuro (Japan) Yuta Shimizu
June 12	Japan F8 Futures; Akishima, Japan; Carpet $15,000; Singles and doubles draws	(Japan) Yuto Sakai (Japan) Yunosuke Tanaka; 6–3, 6–2	(Japan) Rio Noguchi (Japan) Yuta Shimizu	(Japan) Hiroyasu Ehara (Japan) Yuki Mochizuki	(Japan) Koichi Sano (Japan) Gengo Kikuchi (Japan) Sho Shimabukuro (Japan) Yuta Shimizu
June 12	Korea F3 Futures; Gimcheon, South Korea; Hard $15,000; Singles and doubles draws	(South Korea) Kim Cheong-eui; 7–6^{(8–6)}, 6–4	(South Korea) Lee Tae-woo	(South Korea) Chung Hong (South Korea) Song Min-kyu	(South Korea) Jeong Young-hoon (South Korea) Daniel Yoo (United States) Shane Vinsant (South Korea) Lim Yong-kyu
June 12	Korea F3 Futures; Gimcheon, South Korea; Hard $15,000; Singles and doubles draws	(South Korea) Jeong Young-hoon (South Korea) Kim Hyun-joon; 5–7, 7–6^{(7–5)}, [10–4]	(South Korea) Seol Jae-min (South Korea) Song Min-kyu	(South Korea) Chung Hong (South Korea) Song Min-kyu	(South Korea) Jeong Young-hoon (South Korea) Daniel Yoo (United States) Shane Vinsant (South Korea) Lim Yong-kyu
June 12	Poland F1 Futures; Sopot, Poland; Clay $15,000; Singles and doubles draws	(Czech Republic) Zdeněk Kolář; 6–3, 6–2	(Poland) Kamil Majchrzak	(Germany) Jan Choinski (Brazil) Ricardo Hocevar	(Germany) Peter Heller (Argentina) Mariano Kestelboim (Belgium) Julien Cagnina (France) Maxime Tabatruong
June 12	Poland F1 Futures; Sopot, Poland; Clay $15,000; Singles and doubles draws	(Latvia) Miķelis Lībietis (United States) Hunter Reese; 6–4, 6–4	(Brazil) Ricardo Hocevar (Brazil) Wilson Leite	(Germany) Jan Choinski (Brazil) Ricardo Hocevar	(Germany) Peter Heller (Argentina) Mariano Kestelboim (Belgium) Julien Cagnina (France) Maxime Tabatruong
June 12	Romania F3 Futures; Arad, Romania; Clay $15,000; Singles and doubles draws	(Romania) Nicolae Frunză; 6–3, 6–4	(Romania) Petru-Alexandru Luncanu	(Italy) Alessandro Petrone (France) Samuel Bensoussan	(Romania) Alexandru Jecan (Ukraine) Danylo Kalenichenko (Italy) Francesco Vilardo (Sweden) Dragoș Nicolae Mădăraș
June 12	Romania F3 Futures; Arad, Romania; Clay $15,000; Singles and doubles draws	(Brazil) Pedro Bernardi (Brazil) Pedro Sakamoto; 6–1, 6–7^{(3–7)}, [12–10]	(Romania) Andrei Ștefan Apostol (Romania) Nicolae Frunză	(Italy) Alessandro Petrone (France) Samuel Bensoussan	(Romania) Alexandru Jecan (Ukraine) Danylo Kalenichenko (Italy) Francesco Vilardo (Sweden) Dragoș Nicolae Mădăraș
June 12	Spain F17 Futures; Martos, Spain; Hard $15,000; Singles and doubles draws	(Spain) Carlos Gómez-Herrera; 7–5, 4–6, 7–5	(United States) JC Aragone	(Spain) Andrés Artuñedo (Germany) Lukas Rüpke	(United States) Evan King (Spain) Alberto Barroso Campos (United Kingdom) Ewan Moore (Brazil) João Menezes
June 12	Spain F17 Futures; Martos, Spain; Hard $15,000; Singles and doubles draws	(United States) Robert Galloway (United States) Evan King; 6–4, 6–4	(United States) JC Aragone (Australia) Daniel Nolan	(Spain) Andrés Artuñedo (Germany) Lukas Rüpke	(United States) Evan King (Spain) Alberto Barroso Campos (United Kingdom) Ewan Moore (Brazil) João Menezes
June 12	Thailand F2 Futures; Hua Hin, Thailand; Hard $15,000; Singles and doubles draws	(Chinese Taipei) Chen Ti; 6–3, 4–6, 6–4	(Australia) Dayne Kelly	(France) Yannick Jankovits (Australia) Harry Bourchier	(India) Sidharth Rawat (France) Clément Larrière (Vietnam) Trịnh Linh Giang (United States) Hady Habib
June 12	Thailand F2 Futures; Hua Hin, Thailand; Hard $15,000; Singles and doubles draws	(India) Karunuday Singh (Kazakhstan) Denis Yevseyev; 6–1, 6–1	(France) Yannick Jankovits (United States) Evan Song	(France) Yannick Jankovits (Australia) Harry Bourchier	(India) Sidharth Rawat (France) Clément Larrière (Vietnam) Trịnh Linh Giang (United States) Hady Habib
June 12	Tunisia F23 Futures; Hammamet, Tunisia; Clay $15,000; Singles and doubles draws	(Tunisia) Moez Echargui; 7–6^{(7–2)}, 6–3	(Spain) Eduard Esteve Lobato	(Netherlands) Kevin Griekspoor (France) Arthur Rinderknech	(Tunisia) Aziz Dougaz (Netherlands) Scott Griekspoor (France) Florian Lakat (Austria) Lenny Hampel
June 12	Tunisia F23 Futures; Hammamet, Tunisia; Clay $15,000; Singles and doubles draws	(Austria) Lucas Miedler (Austria) Maximilian Neuchrist; 7–6^{(7–2)}, 5–7, [14–12]	(France) Florian Lakat (France) Arthur Rinderknech	(Netherlands) Kevin Griekspoor (France) Arthur Rinderknech	(Tunisia) Aziz Dougaz (Netherlands) Scott Griekspoor (France) Florian Lakat (Austria) Lenny Hampel
June 12	USA F18 Futures; Buffalo, United States; Clay $15,000; Singles and doubles draws	(United States) Alex Rybakov; 4–6, 6–0, 6–1	(Japan) Naoki Nakagawa	(United States) Dennis Nevolo (Japan) Kaichi Uchida	(United States) Maksim Tikhomirov (Canada) Samuel Monette (United States) Raleigh Smith (United States) Cameron Silverman
June 12	USA F18 Futures; Buffalo, United States; Clay $15,000; Singles and doubles draws	(Moldova) Alexandru Gozun (United States) Tomas Stillman; 6–4, 6–3	(Canada) Christian Lakoseljac (Canada) David Volfson	(United States) Dennis Nevolo (Japan) Kaichi Uchida	(United States) Maksim Tikhomirov (Canada) Samuel Monette (United States) Raleigh Smith (United States) Cameron Silverman
June 12	Zimbabwe F1 Futures; Harare, Zimbabwe; Hard $15,000; Singles and doubles draws	(South Africa) Nicolaas Scholtz; 2–6, 6–3, 6–0	(Monaco) Lucas Catarina	(France) Baptiste Crepatte (United States) Dusty Boyer	(United States) Tyler Hochwalt (France) Thomas Setodji (France) Jonathan Kanar (Zimbabwe) Benjamin Lock
June 12	Zimbabwe F1 Futures; Harare, Zimbabwe; Hard $15,000; Singles and doubles draws	(United States) Nathaniel Lammons (Zimbabwe) Benjamin Lock; 6–2, 6–3	(Zimbabwe) Mark Fynn (South Africa) Nicolaas Scholtz	(France) Baptiste Crepatte (United States) Dusty Boyer	(United States) Tyler Hochwalt (France) Thomas Setodji (France) Jonathan Kanar (Zimbabwe) Benjamin Lock
June 19	Chinese Taipei F2 Futures; Taipei, Chinese Taipei; Hard $25,000; Singles and doubles draws	(Japan) Yosuke Watanuki; 6–2, 6–3	(Japan) Yusuke Takahashi	(Japan) Shintaro Imai (Chinese Taipei) Yu Cheng-yu	(United States) Tyler Lu (Chinese Taipei) Yang Tsung-hua (Chinese Taipei) Wu Tung-lin (Japan) Takuto Niki
June 19	Chinese Taipei F2 Futures; Taipei, Chinese Taipei; Hard $25,000; Singles and doubles draws	(Chinese Taipei) Chiu Yu-hsiang (Chinese Taipei) Yi Chu-huan; 2–6, 7–6^{(7–5)}, [10–8]	(Japan) Shintaro Imai (Japan) Takuto Niki	(Japan) Shintaro Imai (Chinese Taipei) Yu Cheng-yu	(United States) Tyler Lu (Chinese Taipei) Yang Tsung-hua (Chinese Taipei) Wu Tung-lin (Japan) Takuto Niki
June 19	Hungary F5 Futures; Budapest, Hungary; Clay $25,000; Singles and doubles draws	(Portugal) Gonçalo Oliveira; 6–2, 6–2	(Serbia) Peđa Krstin	(Austria) David Pichler (Argentina) Facundo Mena	(Czech Republic) Jaroslav Pospíšil (Croatia) Matej Sabanov (Hungary) Zsombor Piros (Spain) Jordi Samper Montaña
June 19	Hungary F5 Futures; Budapest, Hungary; Clay $25,000; Singles and doubles draws	(Croatia) Ivan Sabanov (Croatia) Matej Sabanov; 6–4, 7–6^{(7–2)}	(Austria) Maximilian Neuchrist (Austria) David Pichler	(Austria) David Pichler (Argentina) Facundo Mena	(Czech Republic) Jaroslav Pospíšil (Croatia) Matej Sabanov (Hungary) Zsombor Piros (Spain) Jordi Samper Montaña
June 19	Portugal F8 Futures; Lisbon, Portugal; Hard $25,000; Singles and doubles draws	(Portugal) João Monteiro; 6–4, 1–6, 7–5	(Portugal) Nuno Borges	(Spain) David Vega Hernández (Portugal) André Gaspar Murta	(Portugal) Fred Gil (Australia) Bradley Mousley (Republic of Ireland) Sam Barry (Ecuador) Gonzalo Escobar
June 19	Portugal F8 Futures; Lisbon, Portugal; Hard $25,000; Singles and doubles draws	(Portugal) Nuno Borges (Portugal) Francisco Cabral; 6–1, 3–6, [10–5]	(Republic of Ireland) Sam Barry (Australia) Bradley Mousley	(Spain) David Vega Hernández (Portugal) André Gaspar Murta	(Portugal) Fred Gil (Australia) Bradley Mousley (Republic of Ireland) Sam Barry (Ecuador) Gonzalo Escobar
June 19	Spain F18 Futures; Palma del Río, Spain; Hard $25,000+H; Singles and doubles draws	(Italy) Matteo Viola; 7–6^{(7–0)}, 7–5	(Spain) Alejandro Davidovich Fokina	(Spain) Pedro Martínez (Italy) Raúl Brancaccio	(Republic of Ireland) Peter Bothwell (Spain) Pablo Vivero González (Spain) Roberto Ortega Olmedo (Denmark) Frederik Nielsen
June 19	Spain F18 Futures; Palma del Río, Spain; Hard $25,000+H; Singles and doubles draws	(Denmark) Frederik Nielsen (Republic of Ireland) David O'Hare; 6–1, 7–6^{(7–1)}	(Switzerland) Adrien Bossel (Italy) Matteo Viola	(Spain) Pedro Martínez (Italy) Raúl Brancaccio	(Republic of Ireland) Peter Bothwell (Spain) Pablo Vivero González (Spain) Roberto Ortega Olmedo (Denmark) Frederik Nielsen
June 19	USA F19 Futures; Winston-Salem, United States; Hard $25,000; Singles and doubles draws	(United States) Tommy Paul; 6–4, 6–4	(United States) Christopher Eubanks	(United States) Austin Krajicek (United States) Kevin King	(New Zealand) José Statham (United States) Wil Spencer (United States) Riley Smith (United States) Henry Craig
June 19	USA F19 Futures; Winston-Salem, United States; Hard $25,000; Singles and doubles draws	(United States) Christopher Eubanks (United States) Kevin King; 6–3, 6–4	(Germany) Dominik Köpfer (Venezuela) Luis David Martínez	(United States) Austin Krajicek (United States) Kevin King	(New Zealand) José Statham (United States) Wil Spencer (United States) Riley Smith (United States) Henry Craig
June 19	Argentina F3 Futures; Villa María, Argentina; Clay $15,000; Singles and doubles draws	(Argentina) Facundo Argüello; 6–2, 6–0	(Argentina) Juan Ignacio Galarza	(Brazil) Oscar José Gutierrez (Argentina) Santiago Rodríguez Taverna	(Argentina) Hernán Casanova (Argentina) Juan Pablo Ficovich (Brazil) Nicolas Santos (Argentina) Genaro Alberto Olivieri
June 19	Argentina F3 Futures; Villa María, Argentina; Clay $15,000; Singles and doubles draws	(Argentina) Facundo Argüello (Argentina) Tomás Lipovšek Puches; 1–6, 6–1, [10–8]	(Brazil) Igor Marcondes (Brazil) Rafael Matos	(Brazil) Oscar José Gutierrez (Argentina) Santiago Rodríguez Taverna	(Argentina) Hernán Casanova (Argentina) Juan Pablo Ficovich (Brazil) Nicolas Santos (Argentina) Genaro Alberto Olivieri
June 19	Belgium F1 Futures; Havré, Belgium; Clay $15,000; Singles and doubles draws	(Serbia) Miomir Kecmanović; 6–4, 3–6, 6–2	(Belgium) Christopher Heyman	(Belgium) Clément Geens (Spain) Nicola Kuhn	(Germany) Pascal Meis (France) Samuel Bensoussan (Germany) Lukas Ollert (Belgium) Julien Cagnina
June 19	Belgium F1 Futures; Havré, Belgium; Clay $15,000; Singles and doubles draws	(Chile) Marcelo Plaza (Chile) Juan Carlos Sáez; 6–4, 6–4	(France) Quentin Folliot (Germany) Lukas Ollert	(Belgium) Clément Geens (Spain) Nicola Kuhn	(Germany) Pascal Meis (France) Samuel Bensoussan (Germany) Lukas Ollert (Belgium) Julien Cagnina
June 19	Germany F4 Futures; Kaltenkirchen, Germany; Clay $15,000; Singles and doubles draws	(Spain) Bernabé Zapata Miralles; 6–4, 7–5	(Slovenia) Nik Razboršek	(Russia) Aleksandr Vasilenko (Argentina) Felipe Martínez Sarrasague	(Germany) George von Massow (Germany) Dominik Böhler (Germany) Louis Wessels (Serbia) Milan Drinić
June 19	Germany F4 Futures; Kaltenkirchen, Germany; Clay $15,000; Singles and doubles draws	(Slovenia) Tom Kočevar-Dešman (Slovenia) Nik Razboršek; 6–3, 6–2	(Germany) Johannes Härteis (Germany) Louis Wessels	(Russia) Aleksandr Vasilenko (Argentina) Felipe Martínez Sarrasague	(Germany) George von Massow (Germany) Dominik Böhler (Germany) Louis Wessels (Serbia) Milan Drinić
June 19	Guam F1 Futures; Tumon, Guam; Hard $15,000; Singles and doubles draws	(Japan) Hiroyasu Ehara; 7–6^{(7–4)}, 4–6, 6–3	(Japan) Takao Suzuki	(Australia) Jake Delaney (Japan) Yuichi Ito	(South Korea) Moon Ju-hae (Japan) Soichiro Moritani (Japan) Shunrou Takeshima (Japan) Ken Onoda
June 19	Guam F1 Futures; Tumon, Guam; Hard $15,000; Singles and doubles draws	(United States) Connor Farren (Portugal) Bernardo Saraiva; 7–6^{(7–1)}, 7–6^{(7–4)}	(Japan) Masaki Sasai (Japan) Shunrou Takeshima	(Australia) Jake Delaney (Japan) Yuichi Ito	(South Korea) Moon Ju-hae (Japan) Soichiro Moritani (Japan) Shunrou Takeshima (Japan) Ken Onoda
June 19	Hong Kong F1 Futures; Hong Kong; Hard $15,000; Singles and doubles draws	(China) He Yecong; 6–2, 6–3	(Japan) Yuki Mochizuki	(Australia) Jacob Grills (Japan) Jumpei Yamasaki	(Japan) Masato Shiga (Hong Kong) Wong Hong Kit (Japan) Katsuki Nagao (India) Karunuday Singh
June 19	Hong Kong F1 Futures; Hong Kong; Hard $15,000; Singles and doubles draws	(Philippines) Francis Casey Alcantara (India) Karunuday Singh; 6–3, 4–6, [11–9]	(Japan) Tomohiro Masabayashi (Japan) Yuki Mochizuki	(Australia) Jacob Grills (Japan) Jumpei Yamasaki	(Japan) Masato Shiga (Hong Kong) Wong Hong Kit (Japan) Katsuki Nagao (India) Karunuday Singh
June 19	Israel F11 Futures; Herzliya, Israel; Hard $15,000; Singles and doubles draws	(Israel) Mor Bulis; 6–3, 6–4	(Croatia) Fran Zvonimir Zgombić	(United Kingdom) James Marsalek (United Kingdom) Luke Johnson	(Israel) Alon Elia (Israel) Dekel Bar (France) Lény Mitjana (France) Antoine Escoffier
June 19	Israel F11 Futures; Herzliya, Israel; Hard $15,000; Singles and doubles draws	(Israel) Dekel Bar (Israel) Mor Bulis; 7–6^{(8–6)}, 6–2	(France) Antoine Escoffier (France) Matthieu Roy	(United Kingdom) James Marsalek (United Kingdom) Luke Johnson	(Israel) Alon Elia (Israel) Dekel Bar (France) Lény Mitjana (France) Antoine Escoffier
June 19	Italy F18 Futures; Sassuolo, Italy; Clay $15,000; Singles and doubles draws	(Italy) Pietro Rondoni; 6–3, 6–1	(Germany) Adrian Obert	(Spain) Javier Martí (Italy) Lorenzo Frigerio	(Italy) Walter Trusendi (Switzerland) Adrian Bodmer (Germany) Sebastian Prechtel (Italy) Cristian Carli
June 19	Italy F18 Futures; Sassuolo, Italy; Clay $15,000; Singles and doubles draws	(Brazil) Orlando Luz (Brazil) Marcelo Zormann; 6–3, 6–3	(Italy) Marco Bortolotti (Italy) Walter Trusendi	(Spain) Javier Martí (Italy) Lorenzo Frigerio	(Italy) Walter Trusendi (Switzerland) Adrian Bodmer (Germany) Sebastian Prechtel (Italy) Cristian Carli
June 19	Korea F4 Futures; Daegu, South Korea; Hard $15,000; Singles and doubles draws	(South Korea) Chung Hong; 6–1, 6–3	(South Korea) Kim Cheong-eui	(South Korea) Song Min-kyu (South Korea) Kim Young-seok	(South Korea) Seol Jae-min (South Korea) Cho Min-hyeok (South Korea) Lee Jea-moon (South Korea) Chung Yun-seong
June 19	Korea F4 Futures; Daegu, South Korea; Hard $15,000; Singles and doubles draws	(South Korea) Lim Yong-kyu (South Korea) Noh Sang-woo; 6–3, 6–2	(South Korea) Seol Jae-min (South Korea) Song Min-kyu	(South Korea) Song Min-kyu (South Korea) Kim Young-seok	(South Korea) Seol Jae-min (South Korea) Cho Min-hyeok (South Korea) Lee Jea-moon (South Korea) Chung Yun-seong
June 19	Netherlands F1 Futures; Alkmaar, Netherlands; Clay $15,000; Singles and doubles draws	(Netherlands) Thiemo de Bakker; 6–3, 7–5	(France) Maxime Chazal	(Netherlands) Botic van de Zandschulp (Germany) Robin Kern	(Netherlands) Floris van den Brink (Netherlands) Niels Lootsma (Estonia) Vladimir Ivanov (Netherlands) Tim van Terheijden
June 19	Netherlands F1 Futures; Alkmaar, Netherlands; Clay $15,000; Singles and doubles draws	(Netherlands) Botic van de Zandschulp (Netherlands) Boy Westerhof; 6–2, 5–7, [14–12]	(United States) Patrick Kypson (United States) Sam Riffice	(Netherlands) Botic van de Zandschulp (Germany) Robin Kern	(Netherlands) Floris van den Brink (Netherlands) Niels Lootsma (Estonia) Vladimir Ivanov (Netherlands) Tim van Terheijden
June 19	Poland F2 Futures; Gdynia, Poland; Clay $15,000; Singles and doubles draws	(Sweden) Markus Eriksson; 7–5, 6–1	(Czech Republic) Robin Staněk	(Poland) Paweł Ciaś (France) Evan Furness	(Czech Republic) David Poljak (Italy) Andrea Vavassori (France) Maxime Tabatruong (Sweden) André Göransson
June 19	Poland F2 Futures; Gdynia, Poland; Clay $15,000; Singles and doubles draws	(Bolivia) Boris Arias (United States) Nick Chappell; 6–1, 6–1	(Norway) Fredrik Ask (Sweden) André Göransson	(Poland) Paweł Ciaś (France) Evan Furness	(Czech Republic) David Poljak (Italy) Andrea Vavassori (France) Maxime Tabatruong (Sweden) André Göransson
June 19	Romania F4 Futures; Bucharest, Romania; Clay $15,000; Singles and doubles draws	(Brazil) Pedro Sakamoto; 6–1, 6–3	(Netherlands) Michiel de Krom	(Spain) Miguel Semmler (France) Sébastien Boltz	(Romania) Bogdan Inouț Apostol (Romania) Nicolae Frunză (Italy) Claudio Fortuna (Romania) Alexandru Jecan
June 19	Romania F4 Futures; Bucharest, Romania; Clay $15,000; Singles and doubles draws	(Romania) Adrian Barbu (Romania) Petru-Alexandru Luncanu; Walkover	(Romania) Andrei Ștefan Apostol (Romania) Nicolae Frunză	(Spain) Miguel Semmler (France) Sébastien Boltz	(Romania) Bogdan Inouț Apostol (Romania) Nicolae Frunză (Italy) Claudio Fortuna (Romania) Alexandru Jecan
June 19	Russia F1 Futures; Kazan, Russia; Hard $15,000; Singles and doubles draws	(Russia) Evgeny Karlovskiy; 3–6, 6–3, 7–5	(Russia) Alexander Igoshin	(Russia) Yan Sabanin (Russia) Ilya Vasilyev	(Russia) Maxim Ratniuk (Russia) Mikhail Fufygin (Kazakhstan) Roman Khassanov (Russia) Dimitriy Voronin
June 19	Russia F1 Futures; Kazan, Russia; Hard $15,000; Singles and doubles draws	(Russia) Victor Baluda (Russia) Alexander Pavlioutchenkov; 6–4, 6–1	(Russia) Mikhail Fufygin (Russia) Denis Matsukevich	(Russia) Yan Sabanin (Russia) Ilya Vasilyev	(Russia) Maxim Ratniuk (Russia) Mikhail Fufygin (Kazakhstan) Roman Khassanov (Russia) Dimitriy Voronin
June 19	Sri Lanka F1 Futures; Colombo, Sri Lanka; Clay $15,000; Singles and doubles draws	(India) Sumit Nagal; 6–3, 6–2	(Russia) Alexander Zhurbin	(Italy) Fabrizio Ornago (Spain) Carlos Boluda-Purkiss	(Italy) Davide Galoppini (Russia) Mikhail Korovin (France) Pierre Faivre (India) S D Prajwal Dev
June 19	Sri Lanka F1 Futures; Colombo, Sri Lanka; Clay $15,000; Singles and doubles draws	(United States) Nicholas Bybel (Lebanon) Giovani Samaha; 6–1, 6–2	(United Kingdom) Scott Duncan (France) Nicolas Rosenzweig	(Italy) Fabrizio Ornago (Spain) Carlos Boluda-Purkiss	(Italy) Davide Galoppini (Russia) Mikhail Korovin (France) Pierre Faivre (India) S D Prajwal Dev
June 19	Thailand F3 Futures; Hua Hin, Thailand; Hard $15,000; Singles and doubles draws	(Vietnam) Lý Hoàng Nam; 2–6, 7–6^{(7–5)}, 6–4	(France) Yannick Jankovits	(Australia) Jeremy Beale (India) Sidharth Rawat	(France) Clément Larrière (Australia) Thomas Fancutt (Japan) Ryota Tanuma (Kazakhstan) Denis Yevseyev
June 19	Thailand F3 Futures; Hua Hin, Thailand; Hard $15,000; Singles and doubles draws	(France) Yannick Jankovits (France) Clément Larrière; 6–3, 3–6, [11–9]	(Australia) Jeremy Beale (Australia) Thomas Fancutt	(Australia) Jeremy Beale (India) Sidharth Rawat	(France) Clément Larrière (Australia) Thomas Fancutt (Japan) Ryota Tanuma (Kazakhstan) Denis Yevseyev
June 19	Tunisia F24 Futures; Hammamet, Tunisia; Clay $15,000; Singles and doubles draws	(Spain) Sergio Gutiérrez Ferrol; 7–5, 6–4	(Austria) Lucas Miedler	(Netherlands) Kevin Griekspoor (Tunisia) Skander Mansouri	(Tunisia) Anis Ghorbel (France) Elliot Benchetrit (Netherlands) Scott Griekspoor (Austria) Thomas Statzberger
June 19	Tunisia F24 Futures; Hammamet, Tunisia; Clay $15,000; Singles and doubles draws	(Tunisia) Aziz Dougaz (Tunisia) Skander Mansouri; 6–2, 6–4	(France) Théo Fournerie (France) Louis Tessa	(Netherlands) Kevin Griekspoor (Tunisia) Skander Mansouri	(Tunisia) Anis Ghorbel (France) Elliot Benchetrit (Netherlands) Scott Griekspoor (Austria) Thomas Statzberger
June 19	Turkey F24 Futures; Istanbul, Turkey; Clay $15,000; Singles and doubles draws	(Bulgaria) Dimitar Kuzmanov; 6–3, 2–6, 6–1	(Germany) Marc Sieber	(Italy) Nicolò Turchetti (Spain) Mario Vilella Martínez	(Turkey) Muhammet Haylaz (Turkey) Mert Naci Türker (Croatia) Duje Kekez (Australia) Matthew Romios
June 19	Turkey F24 Futures; Istanbul, Turkey; Clay $15,000; Singles and doubles draws	(Germany) Marvin Greven (Germany) Jannis Kahlke; 2–1 ret.	(Germany) Marc Sieber (Spain) Mario Vilella Martínez	(Italy) Nicolò Turchetti (Spain) Mario Vilella Martínez	(Turkey) Muhammet Haylaz (Turkey) Mert Naci Türker (Croatia) Duje Kekez (Australia) Matthew Romios
June 19	USA F20 Futures; Rochester, United States; Clay $15,000; Singles and doubles draws	(Denmark) Mikael Torpegaard; 6–2, 6–4	(Canada) Samuel Monette	(Japan) Kaichi Uchida (Chile) Gonzalo Lama	(United States) Alexander Knight (United States) Thai-Son Kwiatkowski (United States) Alexios Halebian (United States) Cameron Silverman
June 19	USA F20 Futures; Rochester, United States; Clay $15,000; Singles and doubles draws	(Canada) Hugo Di Feo (Denmark) Mikael Torpegaard; 7–6^{(7–5)}, 6–4	(United States) Luca Corinteli (United States) Thai-Son Kwiatkowski	(Japan) Kaichi Uchida (Chile) Gonzalo Lama	(United States) Alexander Knight (United States) Thai-Son Kwiatkowski (United States) Alexios Halebian (United States) Cameron Silverman
June 19	Zimbabwe F2 Futures; Harare, Zimbabwe; Hard $15,000; Singles and doubles draws	(Zimbabwe) Benjamin Lock; 6–3, 6–1	(France) Baptiste Crepatte	(France) Jonathan Kanar (South Africa) Nicolaas Scholtz	(India) Aryan Goveas (Brazil) Thales Turini (Argentina) Matías Franco Descotte (Monaco) Lucas Catarina
June 19	Zimbabwe F2 Futures; Harare, Zimbabwe; Hard $15,000; Singles and doubles draws	(Zimbabwe) Mark Fynn (South Africa) Nicolaas Scholtz; 3–6, 6–1, [10–7]	(United States) Nathaniel Lammons (Zimbabwe) Benjamin Lock	(France) Jonathan Kanar (South Africa) Nicolaas Scholtz	(India) Aryan Goveas (Brazil) Thales Turini (Argentina) Matías Franco Descotte (Monaco) Lucas Catarina
June 26	Belgium F2 Futures; Arlon, Belgium; Clay $25,000; Singles and doubles draws	(France) Axel Michon; 6–2, 2–6, 6–1	(Belgium) Christopher Heyman	(Belgium) Yannick Vandenbulcke (Serbia) Miomir Kecmanović	(France) Corentin Denolly (Austria) David Pichler (France) Geoffrey Blancaneaux (Belgium) Julien Dubail
June 26	Belgium F2 Futures; Arlon, Belgium; Clay $25,000; Singles and doubles draws	(France) Florian Lakat (France) Arthur Rinderknech; 6–1, 4–6, [10–4]	(France) Geoffrey Blancaneaux (France) Constant de la Bassetière	(Belgium) Yannick Vandenbulcke (Serbia) Miomir Kecmanović	(France) Corentin Denolly (Austria) David Pichler (France) Geoffrey Blancaneaux (Belgium) Julien Dubail
June 26	Canada F3 Futures; Kelowna, Canada; Hard $25,000; Singles and doubles draws	(United States) Alexander Sarkissian; 6–2, 6–4	(Canada) Filip Peliwo	(United States) Raymond Sarmiento (United States) Deiton Baughman	(United Kingdom) Mark Whitehouse (Uruguay) Marcel Felder (United States) Alexios Halebian (United States) Marcos Giron
June 26	Canada F3 Futures; Kelowna, Canada; Hard $25,000; Singles and doubles draws	(Canada) Filip Peliwo (United States) Ronnie Schneider; 7–5, 6–4	(Antigua and Barbuda) Jody Maginley (United Kingdom) Mark Whitehouse	(United States) Raymond Sarmiento (United States) Deiton Baughman	(United Kingdom) Mark Whitehouse (Uruguay) Marcel Felder (United States) Alexios Halebian (United States) Marcos Giron
June 26	China F10 Futures; Kunshan, China; Hard $25,000; Singles and doubles draws	(India) Prajnesh Gunneswaran; 6–3, 6–1	(China) Li Zhe	(China) He Yecong (Latvia) Mārtiņš Podžus	(China) Gao Xin (Japan) Kento Takeuchi (China) Cui Jie (India) Karunuday Singh
June 26	China F10 Futures; Kunshan, China; Hard $25,000; Singles and doubles draws	(China) Gao Xin (China) Li Zhe; 6–3, 6–2	(China) He Yecong (China) Zhang Zhizhen	(China) He Yecong (Latvia) Mārtiņš Podžus	(China) Gao Xin (Japan) Kento Takeuchi (China) Cui Jie (India) Karunuday Singh
June 26	France F13 Futures; Montauban, France; Clay $25,000; Singles and doubles draws	(France) Fabien Reboul; 4–6, 6–4, 7–6^{(7–5)}	(Sweden) Christian Lindell	(France) Benjamin Bonzi (France) Johan Tatlot	(Spain) Adria Mas Mascolo (France) Grégoire Jacq (Spain) Pol Toledo Bagué (France) Alexis Musialek
June 26	France F13 Futures; Montauban, France; Clay $25,000; Singles and doubles draws	(France) Benjamin Bonzi (France) Grégoire Jacq; 6–1, 3–6, [10–7]	(Spain) Adria Mas Mascolo (Spain) Pol Toledo Bagué	(France) Benjamin Bonzi (France) Johan Tatlot	(Spain) Adria Mas Mascolo (France) Grégoire Jacq (Spain) Pol Toledo Bagué (France) Alexis Musialek
June 26	Netherlands F2 Futures; Breda, Netherlands; Clay $25,000; Singles and doubles draws	(Netherlands) Boy Westerhof; 6–4, 6–7^{(7–9)}, 7–5	(Germany) Tobias Simon	(Netherlands) Jelle Sels (Portugal) Gonçalo Oliveira	(Netherlands) Niels Lootsma (Netherlands) Scott Griekspoor (Germany) Robin Kern (Netherlands) Jesse Timmermans
June 26	Netherlands F2 Futures; Breda, Netherlands; Clay $25,000; Singles and doubles draws	(Netherlands) Botic van de Zandschulp (Netherlands) Boy Westerhof; 6–1, 7–5	(Netherlands) Jesse Timmermans (Netherlands) Tim van Terheijden	(Netherlands) Jelle Sels (Portugal) Gonçalo Oliveira	(Netherlands) Niels Lootsma (Netherlands) Scott Griekspoor (Germany) Robin Kern (Netherlands) Jesse Timmermans
June 26	Spain F19 Futures; Bakio, Spain; Hard $25,000; Singles and doubles draws	(Spain) Roberto Ortega Olmedo; 0–6, 6–2, 6–1	(Spain) Alejandro Davidovich Fokina	(Spain) Carlos Gómez-Herrera (Spain) Bernabé Zapata Miralles	(Italy) Edoardo Eremin (Bolivia) Federico Zeballos (Ecuador) Gonzalo Escobar (United States) Evan King
June 26	Spain F19 Futures; Bakio, Spain; Hard $25,000; Singles and doubles draws	(Spain) Roberto Ortega Olmedo (Spain) David Vega Hernández; 6–3, 6–2	(Spain) Carlos Gómez-Herrera (Spain) Juan Lizariturry	(Spain) Carlos Gómez-Herrera (Spain) Bernabé Zapata Miralles	(Italy) Edoardo Eremin (Bolivia) Federico Zeballos (Ecuador) Gonzalo Escobar (United States) Evan King
June 26	USA F21 Futures; Tulsa, United States; Hard $25,000; Singles and doubles draws	(United States) Christian Harrison; 3–6, 6–2, 6–1	(United States) Tommy Paul	(United States) Austin Krajicek (United States) Emil Reinberg	(United States) Spencer Papa (United States) Ezekiel Clark (United States) Ryan Shane (United States) William Blumberg
June 26	USA F21 Futures; Tulsa, United States; Hard $25,000; Singles and doubles draws	(United States) Austin Krajicek (United States) Jackson Withrow; 6–4, 6–2	(United States) Tommy Paul (United States) Nathan Ponwith	(United States) Austin Krajicek (United States) Emil Reinberg	(United States) Spencer Papa (United States) Ezekiel Clark (United States) Ryan Shane (United States) William Blumberg
June 26	Egypt F18 Futures; Sharm El Sheikh, Egypt; Hard $15,000; Singles and doubles draws	(Egypt) Youssef Hossam; 6–1, 7–6^{(7–4)}	(France) Thomas Bréchemier	(Italy) Alessandro Bega (Czech Republic) Tomáš Papík	(Ukraine) Oleg Khotkov (United States) Michael Zhu (Czech Republic) Michal Schmid (Italy) Antonio Zucca
June 26	Egypt F18 Futures; Sharm El Sheikh, Egypt; Hard $15,000; Singles and doubles draws	(Egypt) Youssef Hossam (United States) Junior Alexander Ore; 6–2, 6–3	(Ukraine) Marat Deviatiarov (Egypt) Issam Haitham Taweel	(Italy) Alessandro Bega (Czech Republic) Tomáš Papík	(Ukraine) Oleg Khotkov (United States) Michael Zhu (Czech Republic) Michal Schmid (Italy) Antonio Zucca
June 26	Germany F5 Futures; Kamen, Germany; Clay $15,000; Singles and doubles draws	(Russia) Aleksandr Vasilenko; 6–3, 6–3	(France) Antoine Hoang	(Germany) Louis Wessels (Spain) Nicola Kuhn	(Germany) Paul Wörner (Germany) Johann Willems (Germany) Peter Torebko (Germany) George von Massow
June 26	Germany F5 Futures; Kamen, Germany; Clay $15,000; Singles and doubles draws	(Germany) Peter Torebko (Germany) George von Massow; 6–3, 4–6, [10–5]	(Slovenia) Tom Kočevar-Dešman (Slovenia) Nik Razboršek	(Germany) Louis Wessels (Spain) Nicola Kuhn	(Germany) Paul Wörner (Germany) Johann Willems (Germany) Peter Torebko (Germany) George von Massow
June 26	Hong Kong F2 Futures; Hong Kong; Hard $15,000; Singles and doubles draws	(Japan) Yuki Mochizuki; 7–5, 6–1	(Australia) Jacob Grills	(Hong Kong) Wong Chun-hun (Japan) Shintaro Imai	(Japan) Soichiro Moritani (United States) Evan Song (Japan) Jumpei Yamasaki (United States) Nicholas Hu
June 26	Hong Kong F2 Futures; Hong Kong; Hard $15,000; Singles and doubles draws	(Japan) Soichiro Moritani (Japan) Masato Shiga; 7–6^{(7–5)}, 6–0	(Japan) Shintaro Imai (Japan) Arata Onozawa	(Hong Kong) Wong Chun-hun (Japan) Shintaro Imai	(Japan) Soichiro Moritani (United States) Evan Song (Japan) Jumpei Yamasaki (United States) Nicholas Hu
June 26	Israel F12 Futures; Tel Aviv, Israel; Hard $15,000; Singles and doubles draws	(France) Antoine Escoffier; 6–7^{(4–7)}, 6–4, 4–2 ret.	(France) Hugo Grenier	(Israel) Igor Smilansky (Ukraine) Volodymyr Uzhylovskyi	(Israel) Mor Bulis (Israel) Ben Patael (France) Lény Mitjana (United States) Aron Hiltzik
June 26	Israel F12 Futures; Tel Aviv, Israel; Hard $15,000; Singles and doubles draws	(Ukraine) Volodymyr Uzhylovskyi (Ukraine) Artem Vasheshnikov; 6–3, 6–4	(Guatemala) Wilfredo González (United States) Aron Hiltzik	(Israel) Igor Smilansky (Ukraine) Volodymyr Uzhylovskyi	(Israel) Mor Bulis (Israel) Ben Patael (France) Lény Mitjana (United States) Aron Hiltzik
June 26	Italy F19 Futures; Basilicanova, Italy; Clay $15,000; Singles and doubles draws	(Spain) Javier Martí; 6–2, 7–5	(Austria) Lenny Hampel	(Italy) Adelchi Virgili (Switzerland) Alexander Ritschard	(Italy) Giovanni Oradini (Brazil) Bruno Sant'Anna (Italy) Marco Bortolotti (Germany) Dominik Böhler
June 26	Italy F19 Futures; Basilicanova, Italy; Clay $15,000; Singles and doubles draws	(Brazil) Wilson Leite (Brazil) Bruno Sant'Anna; 7–5, 6–4	(Austria) Lenny Hampel (Switzerland) Marc-Andrea Hüsler	(Italy) Adelchi Virgili (Switzerland) Alexander Ritschard	(Italy) Giovanni Oradini (Brazil) Bruno Sant'Anna (Italy) Marco Bortolotti (Germany) Dominik Böhler
June 26	Korea F5 Futures; Anseong, South Korea; Clay (indoor) $15,000; Singles and doubles draws	(South Korea) Kim Young-seok; 5–7, 6–4, 6–1	(South Korea) Lee Tae-woo	(South Korea) Kim Jae-hwan (South Korea) Oh Seong-gook	(South Korea) Kang Ku-keon (South Korea) Hong Seong-chan (South Korea) Chung Hong (South Korea) Kim Cheong-eui
June 26	Korea F5 Futures; Anseong, South Korea; Clay (indoor) $15,000; Singles and doubles draws	(South Korea) Chung Hong (South Korea) Kim Young-seok; 6–4, 1–6, [12–10]	(South Korea) Lim Yong-kyu (South Korea) Noh Sang-woo	(South Korea) Kim Jae-hwan (South Korea) Oh Seong-gook	(South Korea) Kang Ku-keon (South Korea) Hong Seong-chan (South Korea) Chung Hong (South Korea) Kim Cheong-eui
June 26	Poland F3 Futures; Mrągowo, Poland; Clay $15,000; Singles and doubles draws	(France) Alexandre Müller; 6–3, 0–6, 6–3	(Sweden) Markus Eriksson	(Poland) Piotr Matuszewski (Germany) Jan Choinski	(Sweden) André Göransson (Russia) Ronald Slobodchikov (Italy) Andrea Vavassori (Germany) Bastian Wagner
June 26	Poland F3 Futures; Mrągowo, Poland; Clay $15,000; Singles and doubles draws	(Italy) Antonio Massara (Czech Republic) David Poljak; 6–2, 6–4	(Poland) Karol Drzewiecki (Poland) Maciej Smoła	(Poland) Piotr Matuszewski (Germany) Jan Choinski	(Sweden) André Göransson (Russia) Ronald Slobodchikov (Italy) Andrea Vavassori (Germany) Bastian Wagner
June 26	Portugal F9 Futures; Setúbal, Portugal; Hard $15,000; Singles and doubles draws	(Portugal) Nuno Borges; 6–3, 6–0	(Portugal) João Monteiro	(Italy) Erik Crepaldi (Australia) Daniel Nolan	(United States) JC Aragone (Finland) Emil Ruusuvuori (France) Maxime Tchoutakian (Italy) Matteo Viola
June 26	Portugal F9 Futures; Setúbal, Portugal; Hard $15,000; Singles and doubles draws	(Portugal) Nuno Borges (Portugal) Francisco Cabral; 7–6^{(7–4)}, 6–4	(Australia) Harry Bourchier (Australia) Daniel Nolan	(Italy) Erik Crepaldi (Australia) Daniel Nolan	(United States) JC Aragone (Finland) Emil Ruusuvuori (France) Maxime Tchoutakian (Italy) Matteo Viola
June 26	Romania F5 Futures; Curtea de Argeș, Romania; Clay $15,000; Singles and doubles draws	(Romania) Vasile Antonescu; 2–6, 6–4, 6–1	(Austria) Thomas Statzberger	(Colombia) Cristian Rodríguez (Hungary) Péter Nagy	(Romania) Bogdan Ionuț Apostol (Romania) Alexandru Jecan (Romania) Filip Cristian Jianu (Germany) Christoph Negritu
June 26	Romania F5 Futures; Curtea de Argeș, Romania; Clay $15,000; Singles and doubles draws	(Hungary) Péter Nagy (Colombia) Cristian Rodríguez; 6–4, 7–6^{(8–6)}	(Romania) Adrian Barbu (Switzerland) Riccardo Maiga	(Colombia) Cristian Rodríguez (Hungary) Péter Nagy	(Romania) Bogdan Ionuț Apostol (Romania) Alexandru Jecan (Romania) Filip Cristian Jianu (Germany) Christoph Negritu
June 26	Russia F2 Futures; Kazan, Russia; Hard $15,000; Singles and doubles draws	(Russia) Evgenii Tiurnev; 6–1, 6–2	(Chile) Jorge Montero	(Russia) Richard Muzaev (Russia) Bogdan Bobrov	(Russia) Ivan Davydov (Russia) Denis Klok (Russia) Shalva Dzhanashia (Russia) Yan Sabanin
June 26	Russia F2 Futures; Kazan, Russia; Hard $15,000; Singles and doubles draws	(Russia) Markos Kalovelonis (Russia) Evgenii Tiurnev; 6–2, 7–6^{(10–8)}	(Russia) Alexander Boborykin (Russia) Timur Kiyamov	(Russia) Richard Muzaev (Russia) Bogdan Bobrov	(Russia) Ivan Davydov (Russia) Denis Klok (Russia) Shalva Dzhanashia (Russia) Yan Sabanin
June 26	Sri Lanka F2 Futures; Colombo, Sri Lanka; Clay $15,000; Singles and doubles draws	(Spain) Carlos Boluda-Purkiss; 3–6, 6–3, 7–6^{(7–2)}	(Italy) Alessandro Petrone	(India) Sumit Nagal (Sri Lanka) Harshana Godamanna	(Russia) Alexander Zhurbin (India) Sidharth Rawat (United States) Nicholas Bybel (Spain) Mario Vilella Martínez
June 26	Sri Lanka F2 Futures; Colombo, Sri Lanka; Clay $15,000; Singles and doubles draws	(India) Chandril Sood (India) Lakshit Sood; 2–1 ret.	(France) Nino Portales (Russia) Alexander Zhurbin	(India) Sumit Nagal (Sri Lanka) Harshana Godamanna	(Russia) Alexander Zhurbin (India) Sidharth Rawat (United States) Nicholas Bybel (Spain) Mario Vilella Martínez
June 26	USA F22 Futures; Pittsburgh, United States; Clay $15,000; Singles and doubles draws	(Japan) Kaichi Uchida; 3–6, 7–6^{(7–5)}, 6–4	(United States) Nathan Pasha	(Denmark) Mikael Torpegaard (United States) Dennis Nevolo	(United States) Collin Johns (Canada) Hugo Di Feo (Chile) Gonzalo Lama (New Zealand) José Statham
June 26	USA F22 Futures; Pittsburgh, United States; Clay $15,000; Singles and doubles draws	(Canada) Hugo Di Feo (Denmark) Mikael Torpegaard; 6–3, 6–4	(United Kingdom) Farris Fathi Gosea (United States) Nathan Pasha	(Denmark) Mikael Torpegaard (United States) Dennis Nevolo	(United States) Collin Johns (Canada) Hugo Di Feo (Chile) Gonzalo Lama (New Zealand) José Statham
June 26	Zimbabwe F3 Futures; Harare, Zimbabwe; Hard $15,000; Singles and doubles draws	(South Africa) Nicolaas Scholtz; 6–7^{(6–8)}, 6–3, 6–3	(France) Baptiste Crepatte	(France) Jonathan Kanar (Monaco) Lucas Catarina	(Zimbabwe) Benjamin Lock (Zimbabwe) Mark Chigaazira (Argentina) Matías Franco Descotte (United States) Nathaniel Lammons
June 26	Zimbabwe F3 Futures; Harare, Zimbabwe; Hard $15,000; Singles and doubles draws	(United States) Nathaniel Lammons (Zimbabwe) Benjamin Lock; 7–6^{(7–4)}, 6–2	(France) Baptiste Crepatte (France) Thomas Setodji	(France) Jonathan Kanar (Monaco) Lucas Catarina	(Zimbabwe) Benjamin Lock (Zimbabwe) Mark Chigaazira (Argentina) Matías Franco Descotte (United States) Nathaniel Lammons
