= 2012 ITF Men's Circuit (January–March) =

2012 men's professional tennis tour

The 2012 ITF Men's Circuit is the 2012 edition of the entry level tour for men's professional tennis, and is the third tier tennis tour below the Association of Tennis Professionals, World Tour and Challenger Tour. It is organised by the International Tennis Federation (ITF) who additionally organizes the ITF Women's Circuit which is an entry-level tour for women's professional tennis. Future tournaments are organized to offer either $10,000 or $15,000 in prize money and tournaments which offering hospitality to players competing in the main draw give additional ranking points which are valid under the ATP ranking system, and are to be organized by a national association or approved by the ITF Men's Circuit Committee.

The tournaments are played on a rectangular flat surface, commonly referred to as a tennis court. The dimensions of a tennis court are defined and regulated by the ITF and the court is 23.78 meters (78.0 feet) long, 10.97 meters (36.0 feet) wide. Its width is 8.23 meters (27.0 feet) for singles matches and 10.97 meters (36.0 feet) for doubles matches. Tennis is played on a variety of surfaces and each surface has its own characteristics which affect the playing style of the game. There are four main types of courts depending on the materials used for the court surface, clay, hard, grass and carpet courts with the ITF classifying five different pace settings ranging from slow to fast.

== Point distribution ==
Tournament Category	W	F	SF	QF	R16	R32
Futures 15,000+H	35	20	10	4	1	0
Futures 15,000	27	15	8	3	1	0
Futures 10,000+H	27	15	8	3	1	0
Futures 10,000	18	10	6	2	1	0

== Key ==
$15,000 tournaments
$10,000 tournaments

== Month ==
=== January ===
Week of	Tournament	Winner	Runners-up	Semifinalists	Quarterfinalists
January 2	China F1 Futures; Shenzhen, China; Hard $15,000; Singles and Doubles Draw	(Czech Republic) Jiří Veselý; 6–4, 7–5	(United States) Austin Krajicek	(China) Li Zhe (China) Chang Yu	(India) Saketh Myneni (United States) Devin Britton (China) Xu Junchao (China) Ma Ya-nan
January 2	China F1 Futures; Shenzhen, China; Hard $15,000; Singles and Doubles Draw	(France) Pierre-Hugues Herbert (Slovakia) Ivo Klec; 6–4, 6–2	(Chinese Taipei) Lee Hsin-han (Chinese Taipei) Peng Hsien-yin	(China) Li Zhe (China) Chang Yu	(India) Saketh Myneni (United States) Devin Britton (China) Xu Junchao (China) Ma Ya-nan
January 9	China F2 Futures; Shenzhen, China; Hard $15,000	(United States) Austin Krajicek; 3–6, 6–3, 7–6^{(7–4)}	(China) Zhang Ze	(China) Bai Yan (Japan) Hiroki Moriya	(China) Li Zhe (France) Pierre-Hugues Herbert (China) Ma Ya-nan (China) Wu Di
January 9	China F2 Futures; Shenzhen, China; Hard $15,000	(Chinese Taipei) Hsieh Cheng-peng (Chinese Taipei) Lee Hsin-han; 7–6^{(7–5)}, 6–0	(United States) Devin Britton (United States) Austin Krajicek	(China) Bai Yan (Japan) Hiroki Moriya	(China) Li Zhe (France) Pierre-Hugues Herbert (China) Ma Ya-nan (China) Wu Di
January 9	Germany F1 Futures; Schwieberdingen, Germany; Carpet (indoor) $10,000	(United Kingdom) Josh Goodall; 2–6, 7–6^{(7–4)}, 6–4	(Germany) Bastian Knittel	(Czech Republic) Michal Schmid (Republic of Ireland) Louk Sorensen	(Switzerland) Sandro Ehrat (Croatia) Roko Karanušić (Germany) Moritz Baumann (Germany) Sebastian Sachs
January 9	Germany F1 Futures; Schwieberdingen, Germany; Carpet (indoor) $10,000	(France) Albano Olivetti (France) Élie Rousset; 6–4, 6–4	(United Kingdom) Miles Bugby (United Kingdom) Josh Goodall	(Czech Republic) Michal Schmid (Republic of Ireland) Louk Sorensen	(Switzerland) Sandro Ehrat (Croatia) Roko Karanušić (Germany) Moritz Baumann (Germany) Sebastian Sachs
January 9	Great Britain F1 Futures; Glasgow, United Kingdom; Hard (indoor) $15,000	(Poland) Michał Przysiężny; 6–1, 7–6^{(9–7)}	(Bosnia and Herzegovina) Mirza Bašić	(France) Alexandre Sidorenko (Czech Republic) Jan Minář	(Belgium) Arthur De Greef (Sweden) Michael Ryderstedt (France) Clément Reix (United Kingdom) Daniel Evans
January 9	Great Britain F1 Futures; Glasgow, United Kingdom; Hard (indoor) $15,000	(United Kingdom) Chris Eaton (United Kingdom) Dominic Inglot; 7–5, 6–2	(United Kingdom) David Rice (United Kingdom) Sean Thornley	(France) Alexandre Sidorenko (Czech Republic) Jan Minář	(Belgium) Arthur De Greef (Sweden) Michael Ryderstedt (France) Clément Reix (United Kingdom) Daniel Evans
January 9	Israel F1 Futures; Eilat, Israel; Hard $10,000	(Italy) Claudio Grassi; 7–6^{(7–5)}, 6–3	(France) Gleb Sakharov	(Slovakia) Norbert Gombos (Russia) Victor Baluda	(Slovakia) Adrian Partl (Austria) Dominic Thiem (Hungary) Márton Fucsovics (Moldova) Maxim Dubarenco
January 9	Israel F1 Futures; Eilat, Israel; Hard $10,000	(Italy) Claudio Grassi (Italy) Matteo Volante; 6–4, 4–6, [11–9]	(South Africa) Jean Andersen (South Africa) Ruan Roelofse	(Slovakia) Norbert Gombos (Russia) Victor Baluda	(Slovakia) Adrian Partl (Austria) Dominic Thiem (Hungary) Márton Fucsovics (Moldova) Maxim Dubarenco
January 9	Russia F1 Futures; Moscow, Russia; Hard $10,000	(Ukraine) Stanislav Poplavskyy; 7–6^{(10–8)}, 7–6^{(7–1)}	(Russia) Mikhail Fufygin	(Russia) Andrey Kuznetsov (Russia) Richard Muzaev	(Belarus) Egor Gerasimov (Belarus) Dzmitry Zhyrmont (Russia) Gleb Bagateliya (Russia) Andrei Levine
January 9	Russia F1 Futures; Moscow, Russia; Hard $10,000	(Latvia) Andis Juška (Latvia) Deniss Pavlovs; 7–6^{(7–1)}, 6–3	(Russia) Andrey Kuznetsov (Russia) Stanislav Vovk	(Russia) Andrey Kuznetsov (Russia) Richard Muzaev	(Belarus) Egor Gerasimov (Belarus) Dzmitry Zhyrmont (Russia) Gleb Bagateliya (Russia) Andrei Levine
January 9	Turkey F1 Futures; Antalya-Kaya Belek, Turkey; Hard $10,000	(Bosnia and Herzegovina) Tomislav Brkić; 6–4, 6–1	(Czech Republic) Michal Konečný	(India) Sanam Singh (United Kingdom) Daniel Cox	(Sweden) Carl Bergman (Kazakhstan) Denis Yevseyev (Austria) Marc Rath (Germany) Kevin Krawietz
January 9	Turkey F1 Futures; Antalya-Kaya Belek, Turkey; Hard $10,000	(Bosnia and Herzegovina) Tomislav Brkić (Bosnia and Herzegovina) Aldin Šetkić; 3–6, 7–6^{(7–2)}, [10–8]	(Sweden) Carl Bergman (Sweden) Patrik Brydolf	(India) Sanam Singh (United Kingdom) Daniel Cox	(Sweden) Carl Bergman (Kazakhstan) Denis Yevseyev (Austria) Marc Rath (Germany) Kevin Krawietz
January 9	USA F1 Futures; Plantation, United States; Clay $10,000	(United States) Jack Sock; 6–1, 7–6^{(7–5)}	(Australia) Jason Kubler	(Netherlands) Matwé Middelkoop (France) Nicolas Devilder	(Romania) Gabriel Moraru (Monaco) Benjamin Balleret (Slovenia) Blaž Rola (United States) Nicholas Monroe
January 9	USA F1 Futures; Plantation, United States; Clay $10,000	(United States) Drew Courtney (United States) Jarmere Jenkins; 7–6^{(7–3)}, 7–5	(United States) Nicholas Monroe (United States) Jack Sock	(Netherlands) Matwé Middelkoop (France) Nicolas Devilder	(Romania) Gabriel Moraru (Monaco) Benjamin Balleret (Slovenia) Blaž Rola (United States) Nicholas Monroe
January 16	France F1 Futures; Bagnoles-de-l'Orne, France; Clay $10,000+H	(Germany) Moritz Baumann; 2–6, 7–6^{(7–4)}, 6–4	(France) Alexandre Penaud	(France) Jules Marie (France) Nicolas Renavand	(Belgium) Niels Desein (Spain) Pedro Clar (Serbia) Danilo Petrović (France) Alexandre Sidorenko
January 16	France F1 Futures; Bagnoles-de-l'Orne, France; Clay $10,000+H	(Germany) Peter Heller (France) Tak Khunn Wang; 6–4, 7–6^{(7–3)}	(Belgium) Gaetan De Lovinfosse (Belgium) Yannick Vandenbulcke	(France) Jules Marie (France) Nicolas Renavand	(Belgium) Niels Desein (Spain) Pedro Clar (Serbia) Danilo Petrović (France) Alexandre Sidorenko
January 16	Germany F2 Futures; Stuttgart-Stammheim, Germany; Hard (indoor) $10,000	(France) Franck Pepe; 2–6, 6–2, 6–2	(Germany) Nils Langer	(Switzerland) Sandro Ehrat (France) Albano Olivetti	(Germany) Kevin Krawietz (Russia) Denis Matsukevich (France) Élie Rousset (Croatia) Nikola Mektić
January 16	Germany F2 Futures; Stuttgart-Stammheim, Germany; Hard (indoor) $10,000	(Romania) Marius Copil (Germany) Simon Stadler; 6–1, 6–2	(Germany) Kevin Krawietz (Germany) Marcel Zimmermann	(Switzerland) Sandro Ehrat (France) Albano Olivetti	(Germany) Kevin Krawietz (Russia) Denis Matsukevich (France) Élie Rousset (Croatia) Nikola Mektić
January 16	Great Britain F2 Futures; Sheffield, United Kingdom; Hard $15,000	(United Kingdom) Daniel Evans; 6–2, 6–0	(United Kingdom) David Rice	(Belgium) Germain Gigounon (Slovenia) Luka Gregorc	(Poland) Jerzy Janowicz (United Kingdom) Alexander Ward (South Africa) Fritz Wolmarans (Bosnia and Herzegovina) Mirza Bašić
January 16	Great Britain F2 Futures; Sheffield, United Kingdom; Hard $15,000	(United Kingdom) Chris Eaton (United Kingdom) Dominic Inglot; 6–3, 7–5	(United Kingdom) David Rice (United Kingdom) Sean Thornley	(Belgium) Germain Gigounon (Slovenia) Luka Gregorc	(Poland) Jerzy Janowicz (United Kingdom) Alexander Ward (South Africa) Fritz Wolmarans (Bosnia and Herzegovina) Mirza Bašić
January 16	Israel F2 Futures; Eilat, Israel; Hard $10,000	(United Kingdom) Daniel Smethurst; 6–4, 6–2	(Slovakia) Jozef Kovalík	(Israel) Amir Weintraub (Hungary) Márton Fucsovics	(Italy) Luca Vanni (France) Yannick Jankovits (Philippines) Jeson Patrombon (France) Gleb Sakharov
January 16	Israel F2 Futures; Eilat, Israel; Hard $10,000	(Italy) Claudio Grassi (Netherlands) Antal van der Duim; 6–3, 7–5	(South Africa) Jean Andersen (South Africa) Ruan Roelofse	(Israel) Amir Weintraub (Hungary) Márton Fucsovics	(Italy) Luca Vanni (France) Yannick Jankovits (Philippines) Jeson Patrombon (France) Gleb Sakharov
January 16	Russia F2 Futures; Moscow, Russia; Hard (indoor) $10,000	(Latvia) Andis Juška; 3–6, 6–3, 6–4	(Russia) Evgeny Kirillov	(Belarus) Siarhei Betau (Russia) Mikhail Biryukov	(Russia) Anton Zaitcev (Russia) Sergei Krotiouk (Russia) Ilya Belyaev (Russia) Mikhail Ledovskikh
January 16	Russia F2 Futures; Moscow, Russia; Hard (indoor) $10,000	(Belarus) Siarhei Betau (Belarus) Aliaksandr Bury; 6–1, 6–3	(Latvia) Andis Juška (Latvia) Deniss Pavlovs	(Belarus) Siarhei Betau (Russia) Mikhail Biryukov	(Russia) Anton Zaitcev (Russia) Sergei Krotiouk (Russia) Ilya Belyaev (Russia) Mikhail Ledovskikh
January 16	Turkey F2 Futures; Antalya-Kaya Belek, Turkey; Hard $10,000	(Bosnia and Herzegovina) Aldin Šetkić; 6–2, 6–2	(Croatia) Toni Androić	(Bosnia and Herzegovina) Tomislav Brkić (Bulgaria) Dimitar Kutrovsky	(Ukraine) Artem Smirnov (Canada) Steven Diez (Czech Republic) Michal Konečný (Serbia) Nikola Ćaćić
January 16	Turkey F2 Futures; Antalya-Kaya Belek, Turkey; Hard $10,000	(Croatia) Toni Androić (Serbia) Nikola Ćaćić; 6–3, 6–2	(Sweden) Patrik Brydolf (France) Florian Reynet	(Bosnia and Herzegovina) Tomislav Brkić (Bulgaria) Dimitar Kutrovsky	(Ukraine) Artem Smirnov (Canada) Steven Diez (Czech Republic) Michal Konečný (Serbia) Nikola Ćaćić
January 16	USA F2 Futures; Sunrise, United States; Clay $10,000	(France) Nicolas Devilder; 6–2, 6–3	(France) Olivier Patience	(United States) Jack Sock (Portugal) Pedro Sousa	(United Kingdom) Morgan Phillips (United States) Andrea Collarini (Netherlands) Boy Westerhof (United States) Brian Baker
January 16	USA F2 Futures; Sunrise, United States; Clay $10,000	(Philippines) Ruben Gonzales (United States) Chris Kwon; 6–3, 7–5	(United States) Sekou Bangoura (United Kingdom) Edward Corrie	(United States) Jack Sock (Portugal) Pedro Sousa	(United Kingdom) Morgan Phillips (United States) Andrea Collarini (Netherlands) Boy Westerhof (United States) Brian Baker
January 23	Egypt F1 Futures; Cairo, Egypt; Clay $15,000	(Russia) Andrey Kuznetsov; 6–4, 6–3	(France) Laurent Recouderc	(Brazil) Leonardo Kirche (Egypt) Mohamed Safwat	(Italy) Giulio Torroni (Spain) Gerard Granollers Pujol (Italy) Daniele Giorgini (Egypt) Omar Hedayet
January 23	Egypt F1 Futures; Cairo, Egypt; Clay $15,000	(Spain) Gerard Granollers Pujol (Spain) Jordi Samper Montaña; 2–6, 7–6^{(7–3)}, [10–6]	(Egypt) Omar Hedayet (Egypt) Karim-Mohamed Maamoun	(Brazil) Leonardo Kirche (Egypt) Mohamed Safwat	(Italy) Giulio Torroni (Spain) Gerard Granollers Pujol (Italy) Daniele Giorgini (Egypt) Omar Hedayet
January 23	France F2 Futures; Bressuire, France; Hard (indoor) $10,000+H	(France) Laurent Rochette; 6–7^{(9–11)}, 6–3, 6–3	(France) Mathieu Rodrigues	(France) Kevin Botti (Belgium) Maxime Authom	(France) David Guez (France) Julien Obry (France) Hugo Nys (Monaco) Thomas Oger
January 23	France F2 Futures; Bressuire, France; Hard (indoor) $10,000+H	(Monaco) Guillaume Couillard (Monaco) Thomas Oger; 6–2, 6–3	(France) Julien Obry (France) Laurent Rochette	(France) Kevin Botti (Belgium) Maxime Authom	(France) David Guez (France) Julien Obry (France) Hugo Nys (Monaco) Thomas Oger
January 23	Germany F3 Futures; Kaarst, Germany; Carpet (indoor) $15,000	(Netherlands) Jesse Huta Galung; 6–1, 3–2, retired	(Czech Republic) Jan Mertl	(Italy) Marco Crugnola (Austria) Philipp Oswald	(Poland) Grzegorz Panfil (Japan) Yasutaka Uchiyama (Germany) Oscar Otte (Germany) Alexander Flock
January 23	Germany F3 Futures; Kaarst, Germany; Carpet (indoor) $15,000	(Germany) Alexander Flock (Germany) Nils Langer; 6–4, 6–3	(Italy) Marco Crugnola (Austria) Philipp Oswald	(Italy) Marco Crugnola (Austria) Philipp Oswald	(Poland) Grzegorz Panfil (Japan) Yasutaka Uchiyama (Germany) Oscar Otte (Germany) Alexander Flock
January 23	Great Britain F3 Futures; Birkenhead, United Kingdom; Hard (indoor)	(Belgium) Yannick Mertens; 7–6^{(7–5)}, 2–6, 6–2	(Poland) Jerzy Janowicz	(Czech Republic) Jan Minář (United Kingdom) David Rice	(United Kingdom) Daniel Cox (United Kingdom) Lewis Burton (United Kingdom) Alexander Ward (United Kingdom) Sean Thornley
January 23	Great Britain F3 Futures; Birkenhead, United Kingdom; Hard (indoor)	(United Kingdom) David Rice (United Kingdom) Sean Thornley; 6–2, 6–3	(United Kingdom) Lewis Burton (United Kingdom) Chris Eaton	(Czech Republic) Jan Minář (United Kingdom) David Rice	(United Kingdom) Daniel Cox (United Kingdom) Lewis Burton (United Kingdom) Alexander Ward (United Kingdom) Sean Thornley
January 23	Israel F3 Futures; Eilat, Israel; Hard $10,000	(Israel) Amir Weintraub; 6–1, 6–1	(Italy) Claudio Grassi	(France) Gleb Sakharov (Italy) Alberto Brizzi	(Italy) Luca Vanni (South Africa) Ruan Roelofse (Slovakia) Norbert Gombos (Chinese Taipei) Huang Liang-chi
January 23	Israel F3 Futures; Eilat, Israel; Hard $10,000	(Moldova) Maxim Dubarenco (Austria) Dominic Thiem; 7–6^{(7–5)}, 7–6^{(7–2)}	(Italy) Enrico Iannuzzi (Italy) Luca Vanni	(France) Gleb Sakharov (Italy) Alberto Brizzi	(Italy) Luca Vanni (South Africa) Ruan Roelofse (Slovakia) Norbert Gombos (Chinese Taipei) Huang Liang-chi
January 23	Mexico F1 Futures; Monterrey, Mexico; Hard $15,000	(Moldova) Roman Borvanov; 6–2, 6–3	(Mexico) Daniel Garza	(United States) Adam El Mihdawy (United States) Austin Krajicek	(Brazil) Marcelo Demoliner (Mexico) Luis Patiño (Brazil) Bruno Sant'Anna (United States) Jason Jung
January 23	Mexico F1 Futures; Monterrey, Mexico; Hard $15,000	(United States) Devin Britton (United States) Austin Krajicek; 6–2, 6–3	(Moldova) Roman Borvanov (Guatemala) Christopher Díaz Figueroa	(United States) Adam El Mihdawy (United States) Austin Krajicek	(Brazil) Marcelo Demoliner (Mexico) Luis Patiño (Brazil) Bruno Sant'Anna (United States) Jason Jung
January 23	Russia F3 Futures; Sergiyev Posad, Russia; Hard (indoor) $10,000	(Belarus) Siarhei Betau; 6–2, 6–4	(Ukraine) Stanislav Poplavskyy	(Belarus) Dzmitry Zhyrmont (Belarus) Aliaksandr Bury	(Latvia) Deniss Pavlovs (Latvia) Andis Juška (Russia) Gleb Bagateliya (Italy) Thomas Fabbiano
January 23	Russia F3 Futures; Sergiyev Posad, Russia; Hard (indoor) $10,000	(Latvia) Andis Juška (Latvia) Deniss Pavlovs; 6–1, 6–4	(Russia) Ervand Gasparyan (Belarus) Andrei Vasilevski	(Belarus) Dzmitry Zhyrmont (Belarus) Aliaksandr Bury	(Latvia) Deniss Pavlovs (Latvia) Andis Juška (Russia) Gleb Bagateliya (Italy) Thomas Fabbiano
January 23	Turkey F3 Futures; Antalya-Kaya Belek, Turkey; Hard $10,000	(Bulgaria) Dimitar Kutrovsky; 6–3, 6–0	(Canada) Steven Diez	(Venezuela) Ricardo Rodríguez (Belgium) Alexandre Folie	(Chile) Hans Podlipnik Castillo (Kazakhstan) Denis Yevseyev (Ukraine) Artem Smirnov (Ukraine) Ivan Sergeyev
January 23	Turkey F3 Futures; Antalya-Kaya Belek, Turkey; Hard $10,000	(Ukraine) Vladyslav Klymenko (Ukraine) Artem Smirnov; 2–6, 7–6^{(10–8)}, [10–8]	(Netherlands) Romano Frantzen (Netherlands) Alban Meuffels	(Venezuela) Ricardo Rodríguez (Belgium) Alexandre Folie	(Chile) Hans Podlipnik Castillo (Kazakhstan) Denis Yevseyev (Ukraine) Artem Smirnov (Ukraine) Ivan Sergeyev
January 23	USA F3 Futures; Weston, United States; Clay $10,000	(United States) Brian Baker; 7–5, 6–3	(Australia) Jason Kubler	(United States) Jeff Dadamo (United States) Rhyne Williams	(United Kingdom) Morgan Phillips (United States) Alexios Halebian (Portugal) Pedro Sousa (Japan) Yoshihito Nishioka
January 23	USA F3 Futures; Weston, United States; Clay $10,000	(United States) Daniel Kosakowski (United States) Dennis Novikov; 6–4, 7–6^{(7–4)}	(United States) Vahid Mirzadeh (United States) Michael Shabaz	(United States) Jeff Dadamo (United States) Rhyne Williams	(United Kingdom) Morgan Phillips (United States) Alexios Halebian (Portugal) Pedro Sousa (Japan) Yoshihito Nishioka
January 30	Egypt F2 Futures; Cairo, Egypt; Clay $15,000	(Russia) Andrey Kuznetsov; 6–3, 6–3	(Slovakia) Pavol Červenák	(Spain) Gerard Granollers Pujol (Austria) Michael Linzer	(Italy) Matteo Trevisan (Egypt) Mohamed Safwat (France) Laurent Recouderc (Egypt) Sherif Sabry
January 30	Egypt F2 Futures; Cairo, Egypt; Clay $15,000	(Spain) Gerard Granollers Pujol (Spain) Jordi Samper Montaña; 6–4, 6–2	(Syria) Marc Abdulnour (Syria) Issam Haitham Taweel	(Spain) Gerard Granollers Pujol (Austria) Michael Linzer	(Italy) Matteo Trevisan (Egypt) Mohamed Safwat (France) Laurent Recouderc (Egypt) Sherif Sabry
January 30	France F3 Futures; Feucherolles, France; Hard (indoor) $10,000+H	(Belgium) Maxime Authom; 6–4, 6–2	(France) Grégoire Burquier	(France) David Guez (Belgium) Germain Gigounon	(Monaco) Benjamin Balleret (Poland) Marcin Gawron (Belgium) Yannik Reuter (France) Tristan Lamasine
January 30	France F3 Futures; Feucherolles, France; Hard (indoor) $10,000+H	(Spain) Iván Arenas-Gualda (Spain) Enrique López Pérez; 5–7, 7–6^{(7–2)}, [10–8]	(Poland) Marcin Gawron (Poland) Andriej Kapaś	(France) David Guez (Belgium) Germain Gigounon	(Monaco) Benjamin Balleret (Poland) Marcin Gawron (Belgium) Yannik Reuter (France) Tristan Lamasine
January 30	Germany F4 Futures; Nußloch, Germany; Carpet (indoor) $15,000	(Germany) Nils Langer; 7–6^{(7–0)}, 7–6^{(7–2)}	(Austria) Philipp Oswald	(Romania) Andrei Dăescu (Germany) Alexander Flock	(Czech Republic) Marek Michalička (Germany) Dieter Kindlmann (Slovakia) Miloslav Mečíř Jr. (Japan) Hiroki Moriya
January 30	Germany F4 Futures; Nußloch, Germany; Carpet (indoor) $15,000	(Japan) Hiroki Moriya (Japan) Yasutaka Uchiyama; 7–6^{(7–4)}, 6–3	(Germany) Marko Lenz (Germany) George von Massow	(Romania) Andrei Dăescu (Germany) Alexander Flock	(Czech Republic) Marek Michalička (Germany) Dieter Kindlmann (Slovakia) Miloslav Mečíř Jr. (Japan) Hiroki Moriya
January 30	Mexico F2 Futures; Mexico City, Mexico; Hard $15,000	(Dominican Republic) Víctor Estrella; 7–6^{(7–2)}, 3–6, 6–2	(Uruguay) Marcel Felder	(United States) Devin Britton (Brazil) Marcelo Demoliner	(United States) Austin Krajicek (El Salvador) Marcelo Arévalo (Argentina) Agustín Velotti (Mexico) César Ramírez
January 30	Mexico F2 Futures; Mexico City, Mexico; Hard $15,000	(United States) Devin Britton (United States) Austin Krajicek; 6–3, 6–4	(Dominican Republic) Víctor Estrella (Venezuela) Piero Luisi	(United States) Devin Britton (Brazil) Marcelo Demoliner	(United States) Austin Krajicek (El Salvador) Marcelo Arévalo (Argentina) Agustín Velotti (Mexico) César Ramírez
January 30	Turkey F4 Futures; Antalya-Belconti, Turkey; Hard $10,000	(Bosnia and Herzegovina) Damir Džumhur; 6–4, 7–6^{(7–4)}	(Austria) Nikolaus Moser	(Belgium) Alexandre Folie (Spain) Carlos Gómez-Herrera	(Italy) Andrea Arnaboldi (United Kingdom) Oliver Golding (Ukraine) Ivan Sergeyev (Chile) Hans Podlipnik Castillo
January 30	Turkey F4 Futures; Antalya-Belconti, Turkey; Hard $10,000	(Bosnia and Herzegovina) Damir Džumhur (Bosnia and Herzegovina) Aldin Šetkić; 6–4, 4–6, [10–5]	(Kuwait) Abdullah Maqdes (South Africa) Ruan Roelofse	(Belgium) Alexandre Folie (Spain) Carlos Gómez-Herrera	(Italy) Andrea Arnaboldi (United Kingdom) Oliver Golding (Ukraine) Ivan Sergeyev (Chile) Hans Podlipnik Castillo
January 30	USA F4 Futures; Palm Coast, United States; Clay $10,000	(Australia) Jason Kubler; 6–2, 6–3	(United States) Rhyne Williams	(Portugal) Pedro Sousa (Romania) Gabriel Moraru	(Serbia) Vladimir Obradović (Sweden) Christian Lindell (Romania) Petru-Alexandru Luncanu (United Kingdom) Edward Corrie
January 30	USA F4 Futures; Palm Coast, United States; Clay $10,000	(Sweden) Christian Lindell (Portugal) Pedro Sousa; 6–7^{(7–9)}, 6–3, [10–8]	(United States) Vahid Mirzadeh (United States) Michael Shabaz	(Portugal) Pedro Sousa (Romania) Gabriel Moraru	(Serbia) Vladimir Obradović (Sweden) Christian Lindell (Romania) Petru-Alexandru Luncanu (United Kingdom) Edward Corrie

=== February ===
Week of	Tournament	Winner	Runners-up	Semifinalists	Quarterfinalists
February 6	China F3 Futures; Mengzi, China; Hard	(France) Vincent Millot; 7–6^{(7–3)}, 5–7, 6–1	(Netherlands) Boy Westerhof	(Slovakia) Jozef Kovalík (Netherlands) Antal van der Duim	(Germany) Jaan-Frederik Brunken (India) Vijayant Malik (India) Karan Rastogi (Slovakia) Norbert Gombos
February 6	China F3 Futures; Mengzi, China; Hard	(India) Rohan Gajjar (India) Karan Rastogi; 6–2, 6–4	(China) Gao Peng (Japan) Hiroki Kondo	(Slovakia) Jozef Kovalík (Netherlands) Antal van der Duim	(Germany) Jaan-Frederik Brunken (India) Vijayant Malik (India) Karan Rastogi (Slovakia) Norbert Gombos
February 6	Guatemala F1 Futures; Guatemala City, Guatemala; Hard $10,000	(United States) Michael Shabaz; 6–1, 6–4	(United States) Adam El Mihdawy	(Argentina) Agustín Velotti (Spain) Sergio Gutiérrez Ferrol	(Argentina) Facundo Mena (Australia) Chris Letcher (Colombia) Nicolás Barrientos (Colombia) Sebastián Serrano
February 6	Guatemala F1 Futures; Guatemala City, Guatemala; Hard $10,000	(New Zealand) Marvin Barker (Australia) Chris Letcher; 6–4, 6–4	(United States) Amrit Narasimhan (United States) Michael Shabaz	(Argentina) Agustín Velotti (Spain) Sergio Gutiérrez Ferrol	(Argentina) Facundo Mena (Australia) Chris Letcher (Colombia) Nicolás Barrientos (Colombia) Sebastián Serrano
February 6	Spain F1 Futures; Mallorca, Spain; Clay $10,000	(Spain) Guillermo Olaso; 2–6, 6–3, 6–3	(Spain) Pedro Clar	(Canada) Steven Diez (Italy) Alberto Brizzi	(France) Jérôme Inzerillo (Germany) Kevin Krawietz (Spain) Gabriel Trujillo Soler (Slovakia) Pavol Červenák
February 6	Spain F1 Futures; Mallorca, Spain; Clay $10,000	(Germany) Kevin Krawietz (Austria) Tristan-Samuel Weissborn; 6–2, 6–4	(Spain) Agustín Boje-Ordóñez (Spain) Pablo Martín-Adalia	(Canada) Steven Diez (Italy) Alberto Brizzi	(France) Jérôme Inzerillo (Germany) Kevin Krawietz (Spain) Gabriel Trujillo Soler (Slovakia) Pavol Červenák
February 6	Turkey F5 Futures; Antalya-Belconti, Turkey; Hard $10,000	(Italy) Riccardo Ghedin; 1–6, 6–4, 7–6^{(7–5)}	(Belgium) Niels Desein	(Belgium) Yannick Mertens (Germany) Dieter Kindlmann	(Austria) Nikolaus Moser (Kuwait) Abdullah Maqdes (Austria) Marc Rath (Turkey) Tuna Altuna
February 6	Turkey F5 Futures; Antalya-Belconti, Turkey; Hard $10,000	(Turkey) Tuna Altuna (Czech Republic) Jiří Školoudík; 7–5, 7–6^{(7–4)}	(South Africa) Jean Andersen (South Africa) Ruan Roelofse	(Belgium) Yannick Mertens (Germany) Dieter Kindlmann	(Austria) Nikolaus Moser (Kuwait) Abdullah Maqdes (Austria) Marc Rath (Turkey) Tuna Altuna
February 13	Australia F1 Futures; Toowoomba, Australia; Hard $15,000	(Canada) Érik Chvojka; 6–2, 1–6, 7–6^{(7–4)}	(China) Zhang Ze	(Australia) Mark Verryth (Japan) Hiroki Moriya	(Australia) Brydan Klein (Australia) John Peers (Germany) Gero Kretschmer (Australia) Luke Saville
February 13	Australia F1 Futures; Toowoomba, Australia; Hard $15,000	(Australia) Brydan Klein (Australia) Dane Propoggia; 7–6^{(7–4)}, 6–2	(Australia) Luke Saville (Australia) Andrew Whittington	(Australia) Mark Verryth (Japan) Hiroki Moriya	(Australia) Brydan Klein (Australia) John Peers (Germany) Gero Kretschmer (Australia) Luke Saville
February 13	Brazil F7 Futures; Lages, Brazil; Clay $15,000	(Brazil) Marcelo Demoliner; 7–5, 6–4	(Brazil) José Pereira	(Peru) Duilio Beretta (Brazil) Leonardo Kirche	(France) Jonathan Eysseric (Argentina) Patricio Heras (Brazil) Fabiano de Paula (Argentina) Guido Andreozzi
February 13	Brazil F7 Futures; Lages, Brazil; Clay $15,000	(Uruguay) Martín Cuevas (Brazil) Fabrício Neis; 6–3, 6–3	(Brazil) Victor Maynard (Brazil) João Pedro Sorgi	(Peru) Duilio Beretta (Brazil) Leonardo Kirche	(France) Jonathan Eysseric (Argentina) Patricio Heras (Brazil) Fabiano de Paula (Argentina) Guido Andreozzi
February 13	Chile F1 Futures; Quillota, Chile; Clay $10,000	(Chile) Guillermo Hormazábal; 6–3, 3–6, 6–3	(Chile) Jorge Aguilar	(Argentina) Renzo Olivo (Chile) Guillermo Rivera Aránguiz	(Colombia) Alejandro González (Chile) Cristóbal Saavedra Corvalán (Austria) Gerald Melzer (Austria) Michael Linzer
February 13	Chile F1 Futures; Quillota, Chile; Clay $10,000	(Chile) Jorge Aguilar (Chile) Rodrigo Pérez; 5–7, 7–6^{(7–5)}, [10–8]	(Chile) Guillermo Rivera Aránguiz (Chile) Cristóbal Saavedra Corvalán	(Argentina) Renzo Olivo (Chile) Guillermo Rivera Aránguiz	(Colombia) Alejandro González (Chile) Cristóbal Saavedra Corvalán (Austria) Gerald Melzer (Austria) Michael Linzer
February 13	China F4 Futures; Yuxi, China; Hard (indoor) $15,000	(France) Vincent Millot; 7–5, 6–4	(Slovakia) Norbert Gombos	(Chinese Taipei) Yang Tsung-hua (Chinese Taipei) Chen Ti	(India) Karan Rastogi (China) Gao Wan (Germany) Jaan-Frederik Brunken (India) Rohan Gajjar
February 13	China F4 Futures; Yuxi, China; Hard (indoor) $15,000	(China) Feng He (China) Xue Feng; 2–6, 6–3, [10–5]	(China) Chang Yu (China) Gao Xin	(Chinese Taipei) Yang Tsung-hua (Chinese Taipei) Chen Ti	(India) Karan Rastogi (China) Gao Wan (Germany) Jaan-Frederik Brunken (India) Rohan Gajjar
February 13	Croatia F1 Futures; Zagreb, Croatia; Hard (indoor) $15,000	(Czech Republic) Marek Michalička; 3–6, 6–2, 6–0	(United Kingdom) Richard Bloomfield	(Croatia) Nikola Mektić (France) Jules Marie	(United Kingdom) Alexander Ward (Croatia) Toni Androić (Croatia) Mate Delić (Bosnia and Herzegovina) Damir Džumhur
February 13	Croatia F1 Futures; Zagreb, Croatia; Hard (indoor) $15,000	(Romania) Andrei Dăescu (Romania) Florin Mergea; 7–5, 6–1	(Bosnia and Herzegovina) Mirza Bašić (Croatia) Mate Delić	(Croatia) Nikola Mektić (France) Jules Marie	(United Kingdom) Alexander Ward (Croatia) Toni Androić (Croatia) Mate Delić (Bosnia and Herzegovina) Damir Džumhur
February 13	Panama F1 Futures; Panama City, Panama; Clay $10,000	(Spain) Sergio Gutiérrez Ferrol; 6–4, 6–1	(El Salvador) Marcelo Arévalo	(United States) Michael Shabaz (Colombia) Nicolás Barrientos	(Colombia) Michael Quintero (Colombia) Juan Sebastián Gómez (Brazil) Caio Silva (Guatemala) Christopher Díaz Figueroa
February 13	Panama F1 Futures; Panama City, Panama; Clay $10,000	(El Salvador) Marcelo Arévalo (Mexico) César Ramírez; 6–1, 6–4	(Guatemala) Christopher Díaz Figueroa (Guatemala) Sebastien Vidal	(United States) Michael Shabaz (Colombia) Nicolás Barrientos	(Colombia) Michael Quintero (Colombia) Juan Sebastián Gómez (Brazil) Caio Silva (Guatemala) Christopher Díaz Figueroa
February 13	Russia F4 Futures; Yoshkar-Ola, Russia; Hard (indoor) $15,000	(Russia) Evgeny Kirillov; 7–6^{(7–3)}, 7–6^{(7–3)}	(Serbia) Nikola Ćaćić	(Russia) Stanislav Vovk (Russia) Ervand Gasparyan	(Belarus) Nikolai Fidirko (Czech Republic) Michal Schmid (Russia) Ilia Shatskiy (Russia) Aslan Karatsev
February 13	Russia F4 Futures; Yoshkar-Ola, Russia; Hard (indoor) $15,000	(Russia) Mikhail Fufygin (Russia) Vitali Reshetnikov; 4–6, 6–2, [10–6]	(Russia) Denis Matsukevich (Russia) Mikhail Vasiliev	(Russia) Stanislav Vovk (Russia) Ervand Gasparyan	(Belarus) Nikolai Fidirko (Czech Republic) Michal Schmid (Russia) Ilia Shatskiy (Russia) Aslan Karatsev
February 13	Spain F2 Futures; Mallorca, Spain; Clay $10,000	(Spain) Pedro Clar; 4–6, 6–4, 6–3	(United Kingdom) Morgan Phillips	(Italy) Marco Cecchinato (Japan) Taro Daniel	(Spain) David Estruch (Serbia) Arsenije Zlatanović (Spain) Pablo Martín-Adalia (Canada) Steven Diez
February 13	Spain F2 Futures; Mallorca, Spain; Clay $10,000	(Portugal) Gonçalo Falcão (Portugal) Pedro Sousa; 6–4, 3–6, [10–6]	(Spain) Miguel Ángel López Jaén (Spain) Carles Poch Gradin	(Italy) Marco Cecchinato (Japan) Taro Daniel	(Spain) David Estruch (Serbia) Arsenije Zlatanović (Spain) Pablo Martín-Adalia (Canada) Steven Diez
February 13	Turkey F6 Futures; Antalya-Belconti, Turkey; Hard $10,000	(United Kingdom) Daniel Smethurst; 3–6, 7–5, 6–0	(Moldova) Radu Albot	(France) Gleb Sakharov (South Africa) Ruan Roelofse	(Belgium) Yannik Reuter (Italy) Riccardo Ghedin (Belgium) Niels Desein (Belgium) Gaetan De Lovinfosse
February 13	Turkey F6 Futures; Antalya-Belconti, Turkey; Hard $10,000	(Belgium) Germain Gigounon (Belgium) Yannik Reuter; 7–6^{(8–6)}, 6–4	(Moldova) Radu Albot (Moldova) Andrei Ciumac	(France) Gleb Sakharov (South Africa) Ruan Roelofse	(Belgium) Yannik Reuter (Italy) Riccardo Ghedin (Belgium) Niels Desein (Belgium) Gaetan De Lovinfosse
February 20	Australia F2 Futures; Mildura, Australia; Grass $15,000	(Japan) Hiroki Moriya; 6–4, 4–6, 6–2	(Australia) Brydan Klein	(Canada) Érik Chvojka (China) Zhang Ze	(Australia) Ryan Agar (Australia) James Lemke (Australia) Jason Kubler (Australia) Alex Bolt
February 20	Australia F2 Futures; Mildura, Australia; Grass $15,000	(Germany) Gero Kretschmer (Germany) Alex Satschko; 6–2, 7–5	(Australia) James Lemke (Australia) Dane Propoggia	(Canada) Érik Chvojka (China) Zhang Ze	(Australia) Ryan Agar (Australia) James Lemke (Australia) Jason Kubler (Australia) Alex Bolt
February 20	Brazil F8 Futures; Itajaí, Brazil; Clay $15,000	(Argentina) Guido Andreozzi; 7–6^{(7–2)}, 6–3	(Brazil) Ricardo Hocevar	(Brazil) Leonardo Kirche (Brazil) Tiago Fernandes	(Brazil) Thiago Alves (France) Jonathan Eysseric (Brazil) Thales Turini (Argentina) Patricio Heras
February 20	Brazil F8 Futures; Itajaí, Brazil; Clay $15,000	(Portugal) Leonardo Tavares (Montenegro) Goran Tošić; 1–6, 6–3, [10–8]	(France) Jonathan Eysseric (Brazil) Fernando Romboli	(Brazil) Leonardo Kirche (Brazil) Tiago Fernandes	(Brazil) Thiago Alves (France) Jonathan Eysseric (Brazil) Thales Turini (Argentina) Patricio Heras
February 20	Chile F3 Futures; Santiago, Chile; Clay $10,000	(Austria) Gerald Melzer; 7–6^{(7–4)}, 6–3	(Chile) Guillermo Rivera Aránguiz	(Chile) Guillermo Hormazábal (Argentina) Juan Ignacio Londero	(Colombia) Alejandro González (Chile) Jorge Aguilar (Italy) Alessandro Colella (Austria) Michael Linzer
February 20	Chile F3 Futures; Santiago, Chile; Clay $10,000	(Chile) Jorge Aguilar (Chile) Rodrigo Pérez; 7–6^{(7–4)}, 2–6, [10–6]	(Austria) Michael Linzer (Austria) Gerald Melzer	(Chile) Guillermo Hormazábal (Argentina) Juan Ignacio Londero	(Colombia) Alejandro González (Chile) Jorge Aguilar (Italy) Alessandro Colella (Austria) Michael Linzer
February 20	Croatia F2 Futures; Zagreb, Croatia; Hard (indoor) $15,000	(United Kingdom) Richard Bloomfield; 6–4, 6–2	(Croatia) Toni Androić	(Czech Republic) Jan Minář (Hungary) Márton Fucsovics	(Bosnia and Herzegovina) Mirza Bašić (Croatia) Filip Veger (Serbia) Ivan Bjelica (Czech Republic) Marek Michalička
February 20	Croatia F2 Futures; Zagreb, Croatia; Hard (indoor) $15,000	(Romania) Andrei Dăescu (Romania) Florin Mergea; 4–6, 6–4, [10–4]	(Croatia) Ivan Sabanov (Croatia) Matej Sabanov	(Czech Republic) Jan Minář (Hungary) Márton Fucsovics	(Bosnia and Herzegovina) Mirza Bašić (Croatia) Filip Veger (Serbia) Ivan Bjelica (Czech Republic) Marek Michalička
February 20	India F1 Futures; Chandigarh, India; Hard $10,000	(India) Sanam Singh; 7–5, 6–3	(India) Sriram Balaji	(Japan) Kento Takeuchi (India) Ranjeet Virali-Murugesan	(Japan) Shuichi Sekiguchi (India) Saketh Myneni (Uzbekistan) Sarvar Ikramov (Japan) Arata Onozawa
February 20	India F1 Futures; Chandigarh, India; Hard $10,000	(India) Rohan Gajjar (India) Saketh Myneni; 7–5, 6–3	(India) Vijay Kannan (India) Arun-Prakash Rajagopalan	(Japan) Kento Takeuchi (India) Ranjeet Virali-Murugesan	(Japan) Shuichi Sekiguchi (India) Saketh Myneni (Uzbekistan) Sarvar Ikramov (Japan) Arata Onozawa
February 20	Russia F5 Futures; Moscow, Russia; Hard (indoor) $15,000	(Russia) Andrey Kumantsov; 6–4, 7–6^{(7–5)}	(Russia) Mikhail Biryukov	(Russia) Mikhail Fufygin (Russia) Victor Baluda	(Latvia) Andis Juška (Latvia) Deniss Pavlovs (Russia) Victor Kozin (Russia) Richard Muzaev
February 20	Russia F5 Futures; Moscow, Russia; Hard (indoor) $15,000	(Latvia) Andis Juška (Latvia) Deniss Pavlovs; 6–4, 7–6^{(7–3)}	(Belarus) Siarhei Betau (Russia) Denis Matsukevich	(Russia) Mikhail Fufygin (Russia) Victor Baluda	(Latvia) Andis Juška (Latvia) Deniss Pavlovs (Russia) Victor Kozin (Russia) Richard Muzaev
February 20	Spain F3 Futures; Murcia, Spain; Clay $10,000	(Canada) Steven Diez; 2–6, 6–4, 6–3	(Portugal) Pedro Sousa	(Spain) Marc Giner (Italy) Enrico Burzi	(France) Julien Obry (Spain) Mario Vilella Martínez (United Kingdom) Morgan Phillips (Venezuela) David Souto
February 20	Spain F3 Futures; Murcia, Spain; Clay $10,000	(Spain) Miguel Ángel López Jaén (Spain) Gabriel Trujillo Soler; 6–1, 6–1	(Spain) Marc Fornell Mestres (Spain) Yannick Martell Beuzit	(Spain) Marc Giner (Italy) Enrico Burzi	(France) Julien Obry (Spain) Mario Vilella Martínez (United Kingdom) Morgan Phillips (Venezuela) David Souto
February 20	Turkey F7 Futures; Antalya-Belconti, Turkey; Hard $10,000	(Moldova) Radu Albot; 7–6^{(7–5)}, 6–3	(Russia) Aleksandr Lobkov	(Slovakia) Filip Horanský (Bulgaria) Dimitar Kuzmanov	(Bulgaria) Tihomir Grozdanov (Czech Republic) Robin Staněk (United Kingdom) Daniel Smethurst (Netherlands) Kevin Griekspoor
February 20	Turkey F7 Futures; Antalya-Belconti, Turkey; Hard $10,000	(Belgium) Joris De Loore (Belgium) Yannik Reuter; 6–3, 7–6^{(8–6)}	(Moldova) Radu Albot (Moldova) Andrei Ciumac	(Slovakia) Filip Horanský (Bulgaria) Dimitar Kuzmanov	(Bulgaria) Tihomir Grozdanov (Czech Republic) Robin Staněk (United Kingdom) Daniel Smethurst (Netherlands) Kevin Griekspoor
February 20	Ukraine F1 Futures; Cherkassy, Ukraine; Hard (indoor) $10,000	(Ukraine) Artem Smirnov; 6–1, 6–2	(Switzerland) Sandro Ehrat	(Ukraine) Stanislav Poplavskyy (France) Emilien Firmin	(Serbia) Danilo Petrović (France) Élie Rousset (Ukraine) Oleksandr Nedovyesov (Germany) Matthias Kolbe
February 20	Ukraine F1 Futures; Cherkassy, Ukraine; Hard (indoor) $10,000	(Poland) Adam Chadaj (Poland) Andriej Kapaś; 6–4, 6–7^{(3–7)}, [10–3]	(Ukraine) Oleksandr Nedovyesov (Ukraine) Stanislav Poplavskyy	(Ukraine) Stanislav Poplavskyy (France) Emilien Firmin	(Serbia) Danilo Petrović (France) Élie Rousset (Ukraine) Oleksandr Nedovyesov (Germany) Matthias Kolbe
February 20	USA F5 Futures; Brownsville, United States; Hard $15,000	(Canada) Peter Polansky; 6–1, 6–3	(United Kingdom) Daniel Cox	(United States) Rhyne Williams (Italy) Thomas Fabbiano	(United States) Daniel Kosakowski (United States) Greg Ouellette (United States) Tennys Sandgren (France) Antoine Benneteau
February 20	USA F5 Futures; Brownsville, United States; Hard $15,000	(United States) Tennys Sandgren (United States) Rhyne Williams; 7–6^{(7–4)}, 6–0	(Philippines) Ruben Gonzales (United States) Chris Kwon	(United States) Rhyne Williams (Italy) Thomas Fabbiano	(United States) Daniel Kosakowski (United States) Greg Ouellette (United States) Tennys Sandgren (France) Antoine Benneteau
February 27	Argentina F1 Futures; Cariló, Argentina; Clay $10,000	(Argentina) Juan-Martín Aranguren; 6–3, 7–6^{(7–2)}	(Argentina) Juan-Pablo Amado	(Brazil) Daniel Dutra da Silva (Argentina) Patricio Heras	(Argentina) Andres Ceppo (Argentina) Tomás Buchhass (Venezuela) Luis David Martinez (Argentina) Juan Pablo Ortiz
February 27	Argentina F1 Futures; Cariló, Argentina; Clay $10,000	(Argentina) Juan-Pablo Amado (Argentina) Matías Salinas; 6–1, 3–6, [16–14]	(Argentina) Joaquín-Jesús Monteferrario (Argentina) Juan-Manuel Valverde	(Brazil) Daniel Dutra da Silva (Argentina) Patricio Heras	(Argentina) Andres Ceppo (Argentina) Tomás Buchhass (Venezuela) Luis David Martinez (Argentina) Juan Pablo Ortiz
February 27	Chile F4 Futures; Santiago, Chile; Clay $10,000	(Argentina) Renzo Olivo; 7–6^{(7–2)}, 7–5	(Argentina) Leandro Migani	(Chile) Jorge Aguilar (Argentina) Gabriel Alejandro Hidalgo	(Chile) Matías Sborowitz (Argentina) Federico Coria (Chile) Gonzalo Lama (Italy) Federico Gaio
February 27	Chile F4 Futures; Santiago, Chile; Clay $10,000	(Chile) Jorge Aguilar (Chile) Rodrigo Pérez; 6–3, 6–2	(Chile) Gonzalo Lama (Colombia) Felipe Mantilla	(Chile) Jorge Aguilar (Argentina) Gabriel Alejandro Hidalgo	(Chile) Matías Sborowitz (Argentina) Federico Coria (Chile) Gonzalo Lama (Italy) Federico Gaio
February 27	India F2 Futures; Bhopal, India; Hard $10,000	(India) Sanam Singh; 6–1, 6–4	(Japan) Shuichi Sekiguchi	(Japan) Kento Takeuchi (Venezuela) Jordi Muñoz Abreu	(Sweden) Patrik Rosenholm (Uzbekistan) Sarvar Ikramov (India) Sidharth Rawat (Japan) Arata Onozawa
February 27	India F2 Futures; Bhopal, India; Hard $10,000	(India) Sriram Balaji (India) Ranjeet Virali-Murugesan; 7–6^{(7–5)}, 3–6, [10–6]	(India) Vijay Sundar Prashanth (India) Arun-Prakash Rajagopalan	(Japan) Kento Takeuchi (Venezuela) Jordi Muñoz Abreu	(Sweden) Patrik Rosenholm (Uzbekistan) Sarvar Ikramov (India) Sidharth Rawat (Japan) Arata Onozawa
February 27	Portugal F1 Futures; Faro, Portugal; Hard $10,000	(Portugal) Pedro Sousa; 6–4, 7–6^{(8–6)}	(Italy) Claudio Grassi	(Hungary) Dénes Lukács (Germany) Marc Sieber	(Spain) Pablo Martín-Adalia (Slovakia) Adrian Sikora (France) Laurent Malouli (Germany) Steven Moneke
February 27	Portugal F1 Futures; Faro, Portugal; Hard $10,000	(Portugal) Gonçalo Falcão (Portugal) Pedro Sousa; 7–5, 6–4	(Hungary) Dénes Lukács (Germany) Steven Moneke	(Hungary) Dénes Lukács (Germany) Marc Sieber	(Spain) Pablo Martín-Adalia (Slovakia) Adrian Sikora (France) Laurent Malouli (Germany) Steven Moneke
February 27	Spain F4 Futures; Cartagena, Spain; Clay $10,000	(France) Florian Reynet; 3–6, 7–6^{(7–1)}, 6–1	(Spain) Jordi Samper Montaña	(Spain) Gerard Gallego-Bertran (Italy) Enrico Burzi	(Spain) José Checa Calvo (Spain) Carles Poch Gradin (Germany) Jean-Marc Werner (Japan) Taro Daniel
February 27	Spain F4 Futures; Cartagena, Spain; Clay $10,000	(Spain) Miguel Ángel López Jaén (Spain) Gabriel Trujillo Soler; 6–3, 6–3	(Spain) Jordi Samper Montaña (Netherlands) Mark Vervoort	(Spain) Gerard Gallego-Bertran (Italy) Enrico Burzi	(Spain) José Checa Calvo (Spain) Carles Poch Gradin (Germany) Jean-Marc Werner (Japan) Taro Daniel
February 27	Turkey F8 Futures; Antalya-Kaya Belek, Turkey; Hard $10,000	(Moldova) Radu Albot; 7–6^{(7–5)}, 6–2	(Hungary) Ádám Kellner	(United Kingdom) Edward Corrie (Egypt) Karim-Mohamed Maamoun	(Belgium) Yannik Reuter (Slovakia) Filip Horanský (Czech Republic) Michal Konečný (Russia) Andrey Kumantsov
February 27	Turkey F8 Futures; Antalya-Kaya Belek, Turkey; Hard $10,000	(Belgium) Joris De Loore (Belgium) Yannik Reuter; 7–6^{(7–3)}, 6–1	(Italy) Massimo Capone (Italy) Filippo Leonardi	(United Kingdom) Edward Corrie (Egypt) Karim-Mohamed Maamoun	(Belgium) Yannik Reuter (Slovakia) Filip Horanský (Czech Republic) Michal Konečný (Russia) Andrey Kumantsov
February 27	Ukraine F2 Futures; Cherkassy, Ukraine; Hard (indoor) $10,000	(Latvia) Andis Juška; 7–6^{(7–4)}, 7–6^{(7–4)}	(Ukraine) Ivan Sergeyev	(Serbia) Danilo Petrović (Ukraine) Volodymyr Uzhylovskyi	(Poland) Adam Chadaj (Ukraine) Denys Mylokostov (France) Élie Rousset (Germany) Marko Lenz
February 27	Ukraine F2 Futures; Cherkassy, Ukraine; Hard (indoor) $10,000	(Ukraine) Vladyslav Manafov (Ukraine) Volodymyr Uzhylovskyi; 5–7, 6–4, [10–8]	(Ukraine) Vladyslav Klymenko (Ukraine) Artem Smirnov	(Serbia) Danilo Petrović (Ukraine) Volodymyr Uzhylovskyi	(Poland) Adam Chadaj (Ukraine) Denys Mylokostov (France) Élie Rousset (Germany) Marko Lenz
February 27	USA F6 Futures; Harlingen, United States; Hard $15,000	(Italy) Thomas Fabbiano; 6–1, 4–6, 6–3	(Canada) Peter Polansky	(Slovakia) Ivo Klec (China) Wu Di	(United Kingdom) Daniel Cox (United States) Joshua Zavala (Slovenia) Luka Gregorc (United States) Daniel Kosakowski
February 27	USA F6 Futures; Harlingen, United States; Hard $15,000	(United States) Tennys Sandgren (United States) Rhyne Williams; 6–7^{(6–8)}, 7–5, [10–6]	(Italy) Thomas Fabbiano (China) Wu Di	(Slovakia) Ivo Klec (China) Wu Di	(United Kingdom) Daniel Cox (United States) Joshua Zavala (Slovenia) Luka Gregorc (United States) Daniel Kosakowski

=== March ===
Week of	Tournament	Winner	Runners-up	Semifinalists	Quarterfinalists
March 5	Argentina F2 Futures; Dolores, Argentina; Clay $10,000	(Argentina) Nicolás Pastor; 1–6, 6–2, 7–6^{(7–2)}	(Argentina) Juan-Martín Aranguren	(Argentina) Nicolás Kicker (Argentina) Joaquín-Jesús Monteferrario	(United States) Andrea Collarini (Argentina) Patricio Heras (Argentina) Tomás Lipovšek Puches (Argentina) Rodrigo Scattareggia
March 5	Argentina F2 Futures; Dolores, Argentina; Clay $10,000	(Argentina) Tomás Lipovšek Puches (Argentina) Juan Pablo Ortiz; 1–6, 6–4, [10–8]	(United States) Andrea Collarini (Argentina) Nicolás Pastor	(Argentina) Nicolás Kicker (Argentina) Joaquín-Jesús Monteferrario	(United States) Andrea Collarini (Argentina) Patricio Heras (Argentina) Tomás Lipovšek Puches (Argentina) Rodrigo Scattareggia
March 5	Canada F1 Futures; Gatineau, Canada; Hard (indoor) $15,000	(Germany) Stefan Seifert; 7–6^{(9–7)}, 6–2	(France) Vincent Millot	(Australia) John-Patrick Smith (Canada) Peter Polansky	(Canada) Milan Pokrajac (South Africa) Fritz Wolmarans (United States) Devin Britton (United States) Adam El Mihdawy
March 5	Canada F1 Futures; Gatineau, Canada; Hard (indoor) $15,000	(United States) Devin Britton (Australia) John-Patrick Smith; 5–7, 6–3, [10–5]	(Romania) Andrei Dăescu (Romania) Florin Mergea	(Australia) John-Patrick Smith (Canada) Peter Polansky	(Canada) Milan Pokrajac (South Africa) Fritz Wolmarans (United States) Devin Britton (United States) Adam El Mihdawy
March 5	France F4 Futures; Lille, France; Hard (indoor) $15,000	(France) Kenny de Schepper; 6–2, 4–6, 6–3	(France) Romain Jouan	(Belgium) Christophe Rochus (Belgium) Yannick Mertens	(Netherlands) Boy Westerhof (France) Laurent Rochette (France) Antoine Escoffier (Austria) Philipp Oswald
March 5	France F4 Futures; Lille, France; Hard (indoor) $15,000	(France) Romain Jouan (France) Fabrice Martin; 6–2, 6–2	(Germany) Nils Langer (Austria) Philipp Oswald	(Belgium) Christophe Rochus (Belgium) Yannick Mertens	(Netherlands) Boy Westerhof (France) Laurent Rochette (France) Antoine Escoffier (Austria) Philipp Oswald
March 5	Great Britain F4 Futures; Tipton, United Kingdom; Hard $15,000	(Germany) Peter Torebko; 6–3, 6–2	(United Kingdom) Josh Goodall	(United Kingdom) Neil Pauffley (United Kingdom) Jamie Baker	(United Kingdom) Andrew Fitzpatrick (Sweden) Michael Ryderstedt (United Kingdom) David Rice (Finland) Timo Nieminen
March 5	Great Britain F4 Futures; Tipton, United Kingdom; Hard $15,000	(United Kingdom) Chris Eaton (United Kingdom) Dominic Inglot; 6–3, 6–4	(United Kingdom) David Rice (United Kingdom) Sean Thornley	(United Kingdom) Neil Pauffley (United Kingdom) Jamie Baker	(United Kingdom) Andrew Fitzpatrick (Sweden) Michael Ryderstedt (United Kingdom) David Rice (Finland) Timo Nieminen
March 5	India F3 Futures; Bhimavaram, India; Hard $10,000+H	(India) Sanam Singh; 6–4, 4–6, 7–5	(India) Saketh Myneni	(India) Jeevan Nedunchezhiyan (India) Ranjeet Virali-Murugesan	(Sweden) Patrik Rosenholm (India) Karan Rastogi (Japan) Shuichi Sekiguchi (Uzbekistan) Sarvar Ikramov
March 5	India F3 Futures; Bhimavaram, India; Hard $10,000+H	(India) Rohan Gajjar (India) Saketh Myneni; 7–5, 6–3	(India) Vijay Sundar Prashanth (India) Arun-Prakash Rajagopalan	(India) Jeevan Nedunchezhiyan (India) Ranjeet Virali-Murugesan	(Sweden) Patrik Rosenholm (India) Karan Rastogi (Japan) Shuichi Sekiguchi (Uzbekistan) Sarvar Ikramov
March 5	Portugal F2 Futures; Faro, Portugal; Hard $10,000	(Slovakia) Andrej Martin; 6–2, 6–2	(United Kingdom) Daniel Smethurst	(Spain) Roberto Ortega Olmedo (Spain) Ricardo Villacorta-Alonso	(Spain) Agustín Boje-Ordóñez (Slovakia) Adrian Sikora (Germany) Marc Sieber (Spain) Andoni Vivanco-Guzmán
March 5	Portugal F2 Futures; Faro, Portugal; Hard $10,000	(Slovakia) Andrej Martin (Slovakia) Adrian Sikora; 6–1, 6–2	(Bolivia) Hugo Dellien (Bolivia) Federico Zeballos	(Spain) Roberto Ortega Olmedo (Spain) Ricardo Villacorta-Alonso	(Spain) Agustín Boje-Ordóñez (Slovakia) Adrian Sikora (Germany) Marc Sieber (Spain) Andoni Vivanco-Guzmán
March 5	Spain F5 Futures; Reus, Spain; Clay $10,000	(Italy) Enrico Burzi; 3–6, 6–3, 6–1	(Spain) Marc Fornell Mestres	(Spain) Carles Poch Gradin (Spain) David Estruch	(France) Julien Obry (France) Gianni Mina (Italy) Matteo Trevisan (Spain) José Checa Calvo
March 5	Spain F5 Futures; Reus, Spain; Clay $10,000	(Italy) Enrico Burzi (Italy) Matteo Trevisan; 3–6, 6–0, [12–10]	(Spain) José Checa Calvo (Spain) Carles Poch Gradin	(Spain) Carles Poch Gradin (Spain) David Estruch	(France) Julien Obry (France) Gianni Mina (Italy) Matteo Trevisan (Spain) José Checa Calvo
March 5	Turkey F9 Futures; Antalya-Kaya Belek, Turkey; Hard $10,000	(Czech Republic) Michal Konečný; 6–2, 6–3	(Switzerland) Alexander Sadecky	(Uzbekistan) Murad Inoyatov (Russia) Andrey Kumantsov	(Slovakia) Filip Horanský (Slovakia) Michal Pažický (Turkey) Tuna Altuna (Serbia) Filip Krajinović
March 5	Turkey F9 Futures; Antalya-Kaya Belek, Turkey; Hard $10,000	(Serbia) Ivan Bjelica (Germany) Ivo Mijic; Walkover	(Sweden) Patrik Brydolf (Russia) Andrey Kumantsov	(Uzbekistan) Murad Inoyatov (Russia) Andrey Kumantsov	(Slovakia) Filip Horanský (Slovakia) Michal Pažický (Turkey) Tuna Altuna (Serbia) Filip Krajinović
March 5	Ukraine F3 Futures; Cherkassy, Ukraine; Hard (indoor) $10,000	(Ukraine) Oleksandr Nedovyesov; 6–2, 6–3	(Italy) Viktor Galović	(Russia) Mikhail Biryukov (Ukraine) Stanislav Poplavskyy	(Russia) Denis Matsukevich (Ukraine) Vadim Alekseenko (Serbia) Danilo Petrović (Germany) Marko Lenz
March 5	Ukraine F3 Futures; Cherkassy, Ukraine; Hard (indoor) $10,000	(Ukraine) Vladyslav Manafov (Ukraine) Volodymyr Uzhylovskyi; 6–4, 6–4	(Ukraine) Denys Pume (Belarus) Yaraslav Shyla	(Russia) Mikhail Biryukov (Ukraine) Stanislav Poplavskyy	(Russia) Denis Matsukevich (Ukraine) Vadim Alekseenko (Serbia) Danilo Petrović (Germany) Marko Lenz
March 12	Argentina F3 Futures; Mendoza, Argentina; Clay $10,000	(Argentina) Martín Alund; 6–4, 6–7^{(1–7)}, 7–5	(Argentina) Pablo Galdón	(Argentina) Guido Andreozzi (Argentina) Sebastián Decoud	(Chile) Jorge Aguilar (Chile) Guillermo Rivera Aránguiz (Argentina) Diego Schwartzman (Chile) Cristóbal Saavedra Corvalán
March 12	Argentina F3 Futures; Mendoza, Argentina; Clay $10,000	(Argentina) Guillermo Durán (Argentina) Diego Schwartzman; 6–2, 7–6^{(7–2)}	(Argentina) Martín Alund (Argentina) Francisco Bahamonde	(Argentina) Guido Andreozzi (Argentina) Sebastián Decoud	(Chile) Jorge Aguilar (Chile) Guillermo Rivera Aránguiz (Argentina) Diego Schwartzman (Chile) Cristóbal Saavedra Corvalán
March 12	Canada F2 Futures; Sherbrooke, Canada; Carpet (indoor) $15,000	(Germany) Stefan Seifert; 6–3, 7–6^{(7–4)}	(Canada) Peter Polansky	(South Africa) Fritz Wolmarans (Australia) John-Patrick Smith	(Canada) Samuel Monette (France) Clément Reix (United States) Devin Britton (France) Vincent Millot
March 12	Canada F2 Futures; Sherbrooke, Canada; Carpet (indoor) $15,000	(Romania) Andrei Dăescu (Romania) Florin Mergea; 7–6^{(8–6)}, 3–6, [10–1]	(Canada) Milan Pokrajac (Canada) Peter Polansky	(South Africa) Fritz Wolmarans (Australia) John-Patrick Smith	(Canada) Samuel Monette (France) Clément Reix (United States) Devin Britton (France) Vincent Millot
March 12	Croatia F3 Futures; Umag, Croatia; Clay $10,000	(Italy) Marco Cecchinato; 6–3, 6–4	(Slovakia) Andrej Martin	(Croatia) Dino Marcan (Croatia) Toni Androić	(Austria) Marc Rath (Romania) Andrei Mlendea (Hungary) Attila Balázs (Romania) Petru-Alexandru Luncanu
March 12	Croatia F3 Futures; Umag, Croatia; Clay $10,000	(Czech Republic) Roman Jebavý (Slovakia) Andrej Martin; 6–3, 7–5	(Croatia) Marin Draganja (Croatia) Dino Marcan	(Croatia) Dino Marcan (Croatia) Toni Androić	(Austria) Marc Rath (Romania) Andrei Mlendea (Hungary) Attila Balázs (Romania) Petru-Alexandru Luncanu
March 12	France F5 Futures; Poitiers, France; Hard (indoor) $15,000+H	(France) Josselin Ouanna; 7–6^{(7–2)}, 7–6^{(7–2)}	(France) Kenny de Schepper	(Germany) Nils Langer (France) Olivier Patience	(France) Maxime Quinqueneau (France) Laurent Rochette (France) Nicolas Renavand (France) Grégoire Barrère
March 12	France F5 Futures; Poitiers, France; Hard (indoor) $15,000+H	(France) Olivier Patience (France) Nicolas Renavand; 6–2, 6–3	(South Africa) Ruan Roelofse (France) Gleb Sakharov	(Germany) Nils Langer (France) Olivier Patience	(France) Maxime Quinqueneau (France) Laurent Rochette (France) Nicolas Renavand (France) Grégoire Barrère
March 12	Great Britain F5 Futures; Bath, United Kingdom; Hard $15,000	(Germany) Peter Torebko; 6–2, 6–2	(Sweden) Michael Ryderstedt	(Belgium) Yannick Mertens (United Kingdom) Alex Bogdanovic	(United Kingdom) Richard Bloomfield (Germany) Sami Reinwein (United Kingdom) Edward Corrie (Belgium) Arthur De Greef
March 12	Great Britain F5 Futures; Bath, United Kingdom; Hard $15,000	(United Kingdom) Lewis Burton (United Kingdom) Edward Corrie; 6–3, 6–4	(Belgium) Arthur De Greef (Belgium) Yannik Reuter	(Belgium) Yannick Mertens (United Kingdom) Alex Bogdanovic	(United Kingdom) Richard Bloomfield (Germany) Sami Reinwein (United Kingdom) Edward Corrie (Belgium) Arthur De Greef
March 12	Israel F4 Futures; Herzlia, Israel; Hard $10,000	(France) Axel Michon; 6–3, 6–3	(Sweden) Tobias Blomgren	(Sweden) Patrik Rosenholm (United Kingdom) Andrew Fitzpatrick	(Greece) Alexandros Jakupovic (Poland) Adam Chadaj (Italy) Alessandro Bega (Netherlands) Roel Oostdam
March 12	Israel F4 Futures; Herzlia, Israel; Hard $10,000	(France) Antoine Benneteau (France) Axel Michon; 6–4, 6–7^{(2–7)}, [10–8]	(Greece) Alexandros Jakupovic (Russia) Vitali Reshetnikov	(Sweden) Patrik Rosenholm (United Kingdom) Andrew Fitzpatrick	(Greece) Alexandros Jakupovic (Poland) Adam Chadaj (Italy) Alessandro Bega (Netherlands) Roel Oostdam
March 12	Japan F1 Futures; Nishi-Tama, Japan; Hard $10,000	(Japan) Yasutaka Uchiyama; 6–2, 7–6^{(7–5)}	(Japan) Hiroki Kondo	(Chinese Taipei) Huang Liang-chi (Japan) Shota Tagawa	(Japan) Takuto Niki (Japan) Masaki Sasai (Japan) Arata Onozawa (Japan) Hiroyasu Ehara
March 12	Japan F1 Futures; Nishi-Tama, Japan; Hard $10,000	(Japan) Hiroki Kondo (Chinese Taipei) Yi Chu-huan; 7–6^{(7–4)}, 7–5	(China) Gao Peng (China) Gao Wan	(Chinese Taipei) Huang Liang-chi (Japan) Shota Tagawa	(Japan) Takuto Niki (Japan) Masaki Sasai (Japan) Arata Onozawa (Japan) Hiroyasu Ehara
March 12	Portugal F3 Futures; Loulé, Portugal; Hard $10,000	(Hungary) Dénes Lukács; 6–4, 6–1	(Belgium) Niels Desein	(France) Jules Marie (Spain) Enrique López Pérez	(Spain) Andoni Vivanco-Guzmán (Spain) Sergio Gutiérrez Ferrol (Spain) Roberto Ortega Olmedo (France) Dorian Descloix
March 12	Portugal F3 Futures; Loulé, Portugal; Hard $10,000	(Belgium) Niels Desein (Belgium) Jeroen Masson; 7–6^{(7–3)}, 6–3	(Spain) Guillermo Gómez-Díaz (Spain) Andoni Vivanco-Guzmán	(France) Jules Marie (Spain) Enrique López Pérez	(Spain) Andoni Vivanco-Guzmán (Spain) Sergio Gutiérrez Ferrol (Spain) Roberto Ortega Olmedo (France) Dorian Descloix
March 12	Russia F6 Futures; Moscow, Russia; Carpet (indoor) $15,000	(Latvia) Andis Juška; 6–7^{(3–7)}, 6–3, 6–1	(Latvia) Deniss Pavlovs	(Ukraine) Vadim Alekseenko (Belarus) Siarhei Betau	(Russia) Mikhail Fufygin (Russia) Andrey Kumantsov (Russia) Mikhail Vaks (Belarus) Uladzimir Ignatik
March 12	Russia F6 Futures; Moscow, Russia; Carpet (indoor) $15,000	(Latvia) Andis Juška (Latvia) Deniss Pavlovs; 7–6^{(7–5)}, 6–1	(Belarus) Siarhei Betau (Belarus) Andrei Vasilevski	(Ukraine) Vadim Alekseenko (Belarus) Siarhei Betau	(Russia) Mikhail Fufygin (Russia) Andrey Kumantsov (Russia) Mikhail Vaks (Belarus) Uladzimir Ignatik
March 12	Spain F6 Futures; Badalona, Spain; Clay $10,000	(Spain) Roberto Carballés Baena; 6–2, 6–3	(Spain) David Estruch	(Japan) Taro Daniel (Chile) Hans Podlipnik Castillo	(Colombia) Juan Sebastián Gómez (Italy) Lorenzo Giustino (Russia) Ivan Nedelko (Spain) David Pérez Sanz
March 12	Spain F6 Futures; Badalona, Spain; Clay $10,000	(Spain) Miguel Ángel López Jaén (Spain) Gabriel Trujillo Soler; 6–2, 7–5	(Chile) Hans Podlipnik Castillo (Chile) Ricardo Urzúa-Rivera	(Japan) Taro Daniel (Chile) Hans Podlipnik Castillo	(Colombia) Juan Sebastián Gómez (Italy) Lorenzo Giustino (Russia) Ivan Nedelko (Spain) David Pérez Sanz
March 12	Switzerland F1 Futures; Taverne, Switzerland; Carpet (indoor) $10,000	(Germany) Moritz Baumann; 6–4, 4–6, 6–4	(Switzerland) Henri Laaksonen	(Italy) Claudio Grassi (Germany) Florian Fallert	(Italy) Roberto Marcora (France) Franck Pepe (Switzerland) Alexander Sadecky (Italy) Luca Vanni
March 12	Switzerland F1 Futures; Taverne, Switzerland; Carpet (indoor) $10,000	(Germany) Gero Kretschmer (Germany) Jakob Sude; 6–4, 7–5	(Italy) Enrico Iannuzzi (Italy) Luca Vanni	(Italy) Claudio Grassi (Germany) Florian Fallert	(Italy) Roberto Marcora (France) Franck Pepe (Switzerland) Alexander Sadecky (Italy) Luca Vanni
March 12	Turkey F10 Futures; Antalya-Ali Bey, Turkey; Clay $10,000	(Netherlands) Nick van der Meer; 7–6^{(11–9)}, 6–1	(Slovakia) Pavol Červenák	(France) Florian Reynet (Bulgaria) Dimitar Kuzmanov	(Italy) Giulio Torroni (Brazil) Christian Lindell (Ukraine) Ivan Sergeyev (Bulgaria) Tihomir Grozdanov
March 12	Turkey F10 Futures; Antalya-Ali Bey, Turkey; Clay $10,000	(Bulgaria) Tihomir Grozdanov (Bulgaria) Dimitar Kuzmanov; 6–3, 6–3	(Serbia) Ivan Bjelica (Serbia) Arsenije Zlatanović	(France) Florian Reynet (Bulgaria) Dimitar Kuzmanov	(Italy) Giulio Torroni (Brazil) Christian Lindell (Ukraine) Ivan Sergeyev (Bulgaria) Tihomir Grozdanov
March 12	USA F7 Futures; Calabasas, United States; Hard $15,000	(United States) Tennys Sandgren; 6–3, 7–5	(United States) Daniel Kosakowski	(Germany) Andre Begemann (Australia) Carsten Ball	(Brazil) Pedro Zerbini (Zimbabwe) Takanyi Garanganga (United States) Brian Baker (Australia) John Peers
March 12	USA F7 Futures; Calabasas, United States; Hard $15,000	(Australia) Carsten Ball (Germany) Andre Begemann; 7–6^{(9–7)}, 6–4	(Australia) Nima Roshan (New Zealand) Artem Sitak	(Germany) Andre Begemann (Australia) Carsten Ball	(Brazil) Pedro Zerbini (Zimbabwe) Takanyi Garanganga (United States) Brian Baker (Australia) John Peers
March 19	Argentina F4 Futures; Córdoba, Argentina; Clay $10,000	(Argentina) Agustín Velotti; 6–4, 6–2	(Argentina) Diego Schwartzman	(Argentina) Facundo Argüello (Argentina) Renzo Olivo	(Argentina) Juan-Pablo Amado (Peru) Sergio Galdós (Argentina) Nicolás Pastor (Argentina) Nicolás Kicker
March 19	Argentina F4 Futures; Córdoba, Argentina; Clay $10,000	(Argentina) Maximiliano Estévez (Argentina) Diego Schwartzman; 6–1, 6–1	(Brazil) Diego Matos (Argentina) Renzo Olivo	(Argentina) Facundo Argüello (Argentina) Renzo Olivo	(Argentina) Juan-Pablo Amado (Peru) Sergio Galdós (Argentina) Nicolás Pastor (Argentina) Nicolás Kicker
March 19	Australia F3 Futures; Ipswich, Australia; Clay $15,000	(Australia) Samuel Groth; 5–7, 6–3, 6–2	(Australia) Jason Kubler	(New Zealand) José Statham (Australia) James Lemke	(Australia) Dane Propoggia (Australia) Matthew Barton (Australia) John Millman (New Zealand) Logan Mackenzie
March 19	Australia F3 Futures; Ipswich, Australia; Clay $15,000	(Australia) Adam Feeney (Australia) Adam Hubble; 6–4, 6–4	(Australia) Brydan Klein (New Zealand) José Statham	(New Zealand) José Statham (Australia) James Lemke	(Australia) Dane Propoggia (Australia) Matthew Barton (Australia) John Millman (New Zealand) Logan Mackenzie
March 19	Croatia F4 Futures; Poreč, Croatia; Clay $10,000	(Germany) Kevin Krawietz; 6–3, 5–7, 6–3	(Croatia) Dino Marcan	(Germany) Marc Sieber (Hungary) Attila Balázs	(Austria) Gerald Melzer (Slovakia) Andrej Martin (Romania) Petru-Alexandru Luncanu (Croatia) Marin Bradarić
March 19	Croatia F4 Futures; Poreč, Croatia; Clay $10,000	(Hungary) Attila Balázs (Hungary) Kornél Bardóczky; 2–6, 6–1, [10–8]	(Germany) Steven Moneke (Germany) Marc Sieber	(Germany) Marc Sieber (Hungary) Attila Balázs	(Austria) Gerald Melzer (Slovakia) Andrej Martin (Romania) Petru-Alexandru Luncanu (Croatia) Marin Bradarić
March 19	France F6 Futures; Saint-Raphaël, France; Hard (indoor) $10,000	(France) Laurent Rochette; 6–4, 6–1	(Belgium) Niels Desein	(Belgium) Joris De Loore (France) Jérôme Inzerillo	(France) Jonathan Eysseric (France) Hugo Nys (France) Laurent Lokoli (France) Olivier Patience
March 19	France F6 Futures; Saint-Raphaël, France; Hard (indoor) $10,000	(South Africa) Jean Andersen (South Africa) Ruan Roelofse; 6–2, 6–4	(France) Thomas Le Boulch (France) Baptiste Maitre	(Belgium) Joris De Loore (France) Jérôme Inzerillo	(France) Jonathan Eysseric (France) Hugo Nys (France) Laurent Lokoli (France) Olivier Patience
March 19	Israel F5 Futures; Herzlia, Israel; Hard $10,000	(United Kingdom) Andrew Fitzpatrick; 6–7^{(3–7)}, 6–4, 6–4	(Hungary) Ádám Kellner	(Poland) Adam Chadaj (Switzerland) Adrien Bossel	(France) Antoine Benneteau (Israel) Bar Tzuf Botzer (Austria) Lukas Jastraunig (France) Axel Michon
March 19	Israel F5 Futures; Herzlia, Israel; Hard $10,000	(Poland) Adam Chadaj (Poland) Piotr Gadomski; 7–5, 6–3	(France) Antoine Benneteau (France) Axel Michon	(Poland) Adam Chadaj (Switzerland) Adrien Bossel	(France) Antoine Benneteau (Israel) Bar Tzuf Botzer (Austria) Lukas Jastraunig (France) Axel Michon
March 19	Italy F1 Futures; Trento, Italy; Hard (indoor) $15,000	(Serbia) Boris Pašanski; 1–6, 6–1, 7–6^{(7–4)}	(Italy) Stefano Galvani	(Italy) Claudio Grassi (Bosnia and Herzegovina) Damir Džumhur	(Italy) Giacomo Oradini (Italy) Marco Crugnola (Italy) Enrico Burzi (Italy) Federico Gaio
March 19	Italy F1 Futures; Trento, Italy; Hard (indoor) $15,000	(Italy) Marco Crugnola (Italy) Claudio Grassi; 6–4, 6–4	(Serbia) Nikola Ćaćić (Bosnia and Herzegovina) Damir Džumhur	(Italy) Claudio Grassi (Bosnia and Herzegovina) Damir Džumhur	(Italy) Giacomo Oradini (Italy) Marco Crugnola (Italy) Enrico Burzi (Italy) Federico Gaio
March 19	Japan F2 Futures; Nishitōkyō, Japan; Hard $10,000	(China) Chang Yu; 6–2, 6–3	(Japan) Takuto Niki	(Japan) Toshihide Matsui (Japan) Hiroyasu Ehara	(China) Ouyang Bowen (Thailand) Kittiphong Wachiramanowong (Japan) Sho Katayama (Japan) Hiroki Kondo
March 19	Japan F2 Futures; Nishitōkyō, Japan; Hard $10,000	(Japan) Takuto Niki (Japan) Arata Onozawa; 3–6, 6–1, [10–6]	(China) Chang Yu (China) Gao Xin	(Japan) Toshihide Matsui (Japan) Hiroyasu Ehara	(China) Ouyang Bowen (Thailand) Kittiphong Wachiramanowong (Japan) Sho Katayama (Japan) Hiroki Kondo
March 19	Russia F7 Futures; Tyumen, Russia; Hard (indoor) $15,000	(Russia) Evgeny Kirillov; 7–6^{(11–9)}, 6–3	(Netherlands) Boy Westerhof	(Ukraine) Denys Molchanov (Belarus) Andrei Vasilevski	(Latvia) Andis Juška (Russia) Ilia Shatskiy (Russia) Aslan Karatsev (Latvia) Deniss Pavlovs
March 19	Russia F7 Futures; Tyumen, Russia; Hard (indoor) $15,000	(Latvia) Andis Juška (Latvia) Deniss Pavlovs; 6–3, 6–4	(Russia) Sergei Krotiouk (Belarus) Andrei Vasilevski	(Ukraine) Denys Molchanov (Belarus) Andrei Vasilevski	(Latvia) Andis Juška (Russia) Ilia Shatskiy (Russia) Aslan Karatsev (Latvia) Deniss Pavlovs
March 19	Switzerland F2 Futures; Vaduz, Liechtenstein; Carpet (indoor) $10,000	(France) Gleb Sakharov; 7–6^{(7–1)}, 6–3	(Germany) Moritz Baumann	(Austria) Maximilian Neuchrist (Austria) Johannes Ager	(Croatia) Mate Pavić (Germany) Robin Kern (Germany) Gero Kretschmer (France) Franck Pepe
March 19	Switzerland F2 Futures; Vaduz, Liechtenstein; Carpet (indoor) $10,000	(Germany) Gero Kretschmer (Germany) Jakob Sude; 7–5, 7–6^{(8–6)}	(Switzerland) Sandro Ehrat (Germany) Matthias Kolbe	(Austria) Maximilian Neuchrist (Austria) Johannes Ager	(Croatia) Mate Pavić (Germany) Robin Kern (Germany) Gero Kretschmer (France) Franck Pepe
March 19	Turkey F11 Futures; Antalya-Ali Bey, Turkey; Clay $10,000	(Ukraine) Ivan Sergeyev; 6–2, 6–2	(France) Florian Reynet	(Spain) Sergio Gutiérrez Ferrol (Netherlands) Nick van der Meer	(Slovakia) Pavol Červenák (Serbia) Arsenije Zlatanović (Moldova) Andrei Gorban (Sweden) Patrik Brydolf
March 19	Turkey F11 Futures; Antalya-Ali Bey, Turkey; Clay $10,000	(Moldova) Andrei Ciumac (Ukraine) Ivan Sergeyev; 6–3, 7–6^{(7–5)}	(Sweden) Patrik Brydolf (France) Florian Reynet	(Spain) Sergio Gutiérrez Ferrol (Netherlands) Nick van der Meer	(Slovakia) Pavol Červenák (Serbia) Arsenije Zlatanović (Moldova) Andrei Gorban (Sweden) Patrik Brydolf
March 19	United Arab Emirates F1 Futures; Fujairah, United Arab Emirates; Hard $10,000	(France) Jules Marie; 6–2, 2–6, 6–3	(Italy) Roberto Marcora	(Spain) Jordi Samper Montaña (United Kingdom) James Marsalek	(Republic of Ireland) Sam Barry (India) Jeevan Nedunchezhiyan (Hungary) Gábor Csonka (Czech Republic) Michal Schmid
March 19	United Arab Emirates F1 Futures; Fujairah, United Arab Emirates; Hard $10,000	(Republic of Ireland) Sam Barry (United Kingdom) James Marsalek; 6–4, 7–6^{(7–4)}	(Germany) Alex Satschko (Russia) Mikhail Vasiliev	(Spain) Jordi Samper Montaña (United Kingdom) James Marsalek	(Republic of Ireland) Sam Barry (India) Jeevan Nedunchezhiyan (Hungary) Gábor Csonka (Czech Republic) Michal Schmid
March 19	USA F8 Futures; Costa Mesa, United States; Hard $15,000	(United States) Brian Baker; 6–1, 6–2	(United States) Greg Ouellette	(United States) Joshua Zavala (Zimbabwe) Takanyi Garanganga	(Australia) John Peers (New Zealand) Artem Sitak (United States) Bjorn Fratangelo (United States) Tennys Sandgren
March 19	USA F8 Futures; Costa Mesa, United States; Hard $15,000	(United States) Nicolas Meister (Australia) John Peers; 6–3, 6–7^{(1–7)}, [17–15]	(Australia) Carsten Ball (Germany) Andre Begemann	(United States) Joshua Zavala (Zimbabwe) Takanyi Garanganga	(Australia) John Peers (New Zealand) Artem Sitak (United States) Bjorn Fratangelo (United States) Tennys Sandgren
March 26	Argentina F5 Futures; Villa del Dique, Argentina; Clay $10,000	(Argentina) Renzo Olivo; 7–5, 6–7^{(7–9)}, 6–4	(Brazil) José Pereira	(Argentina) Diego Schwartzman (Argentina) Nicolás Pastor	(Argentina) Facundo Argüello (Argentina) Matías Salinas (Argentina) Guillermo Durán (Argentina) Kevin Konfederak
March 26	Argentina F5 Futures; Villa del Dique, Argentina; Clay $10,000	(Argentina) Valentín Florez (Argentina) Kevin Konfederak; 6–4, 6–4	(Argentina) Tomás Lipovšek Puches (Argentina) Juan Pablo Ortiz	(Argentina) Diego Schwartzman (Argentina) Nicolás Pastor	(Argentina) Facundo Argüello (Argentina) Matías Salinas (Argentina) Guillermo Durán (Argentina) Kevin Konfederak
March 26	Australia F4 Futures; Bundaberg, Australia; Clay $15,000	(Australia) Jason Kubler; 6–4, 1–6, 6–1	(Australia) John Millman	(Australia) James Lemke (Australia) Maverick Banes	(New Zealand) José Statham (Australia) Brydan Klein (Australia) Dane Propoggia (Australia) Andrew Harris
March 26	Australia F4 Futures; Bundaberg, Australia; Clay $15,000	(Australia) James Lemke (Australia) Dane Propoggia; 6–3, 6–2	(Australia) Adam Feeney (Australia) Adam Hubble	(Australia) James Lemke (Australia) Maverick Banes	(New Zealand) José Statham (Australia) Brydan Klein (Australia) Dane Propoggia (Australia) Andrew Harris
March 26	Bahrain F1 Futures; Manama, Bahrain; Hard $10,000	(Republic of Ireland) James McGee; 6–4, 6–4	(Spain) Jordi Samper Montaña	(France) Jules Marie (Sweden) Lucas Renard	(Italy) Roberto Marcora (Czech Republic) Michal Schmid (Netherlands) Lennert van der Linden (France) Antoine Escoffier
March 26	Bahrain F1 Futures; Manama, Bahrain; Hard $10,000	(Republic of Ireland) Sam Barry (Republic of Ireland) James McGee; 7–5, 4–6, [10–8]	(Germany) Jeremy Jahn (United Kingdom) Matthew Short	(France) Jules Marie (Sweden) Lucas Renard	(Italy) Roberto Marcora (Czech Republic) Michal Schmid (Netherlands) Lennert van der Linden (France) Antoine Escoffier
March 26	Croatia F5 Futures; Rovinj, Croatia; Clay $10,000	(Spain) Roberto Carballés Baena; 6–4, 4–6, 7–5	(Germany) Marc Sieber	(Croatia) Dino Marcan (Japan) Taro Daniel	(Russia) Aleksandr Lobkov (Germany) Kevin Krawietz (Austria) Gerald Melzer (Germany) Steven Moneke
March 26	Croatia F5 Futures; Rovinj, Croatia; Clay $10,000	(Germany) Kevin Krawietz (Germany) Marcel Zimmermann; 6–4, 6–4	(Croatia) Marin Draganja (Croatia) Dino Marcan	(Croatia) Dino Marcan (Japan) Taro Daniel	(Russia) Aleksandr Lobkov (Germany) Kevin Krawietz (Austria) Gerald Melzer (Germany) Steven Moneke
March 26	Israel F6 Futures; Herzlia, Israel; Hard $10,000	(Israel) Amir Weintraub; 7–5, 6–0	(France) Axel Michon	(Italy) Alessandro Bega (United Kingdom) George Morgan	(France) Antoine Benneteau (Moldova) Maxim Dubarenco (Switzerland) Adrien Bossel (United Kingdom) Andrew Fitzpatrick
March 26	Israel F6 Futures; Herzlia, Israel; Hard $10,000	(Hungary) Levente Gödry (Hungary) Ádám Kellner; 6–3, 6–3	(France) Antoine Benneteau (France) Axel Michon	(Italy) Alessandro Bega (United Kingdom) George Morgan	(France) Antoine Benneteau (Moldova) Maxim Dubarenco (Switzerland) Adrien Bossel (United Kingdom) Andrew Fitzpatrick
March 26	Italy F2 Futures; Cividino, Italy; Hard $10,000	(Bosnia and Herzegovina) Damir Džumhur; 6–4, 6–4	(France) Charles-Antoine Brézac	(Italy) Giacomo Oradini (Bulgaria) Valentin Dimov	(Belgium) Yannik Reuter (Italy) Lorenzo Frigerio (Italy) Andrea Agazzi (Italy) Enrico Iannuzzi
March 26	Italy F2 Futures; Cividino, Italy; Hard $10,000	(Republic of Ireland) James Cluskey (India) Purav Raja; 6–7^{(10–12)}, 6–4, [10–2]	(Italy) Andrea Agazzi (Italy) Enrico Iannuzzi	(Italy) Giacomo Oradini (Bulgaria) Valentin Dimov	(Belgium) Yannik Reuter (Italy) Lorenzo Frigerio (Italy) Andrea Agazzi (Italy) Enrico Iannuzzi
March 26	Japan F3 Futures; Kofu, Japan; Hard $10,000	(Japan) Hiroki Moriya; 6–1, 6–4	(Japan) Yasutaka Uchiyama	(Chinese Taipei) Huang Liang-chi (China) Wang Chuhan	(Japan) Shuichi Sekiguchi (Japan) Toshihide Matsui (Japan) Hiroki Kondo (Japan) Yuichi Ito
March 26	Japan F3 Futures; Kofu, Japan; Hard $10,000	(Chinese Taipei) Peng Hsien-yin (Japan) Bumpei Sato; 6–3, 5–7, [10–6]	(China) Chang Yu (China) Gao Xin	(Chinese Taipei) Huang Liang-chi (China) Wang Chuhan	(Japan) Shuichi Sekiguchi (Japan) Toshihide Matsui (Japan) Hiroki Kondo (Japan) Yuichi Ito
March 26	Kazakhstan F1 Futures; Almaty, Kazakhstan; Hard (indoor) $10,000	(Kazakhstan) Alexey Kedryuk; 6–3, 1–6, 6–0	(Belarus) Egor Gerasimov	(Russia) Alexey Vatutin (Kazakhstan) Denis Yevseyev	(Kazakhstan) Dmitriy Makeyev (Russia) Sergei Krotiouk (Russia) Andrei Levine (Russia) Mikhail Biryukov
March 26	Kazakhstan F1 Futures; Almaty, Kazakhstan; Hard (indoor) $10,000	(Belarus) Egor Gerasimov (Russia) Andrei Levine; 6–1, 6–2	(Russia) Vitaliy Kachanovskiy (Russia) Alexander Pavlioutchenkov	(Russia) Alexey Vatutin (Kazakhstan) Denis Yevseyev	(Kazakhstan) Dmitriy Makeyev (Russia) Sergei Krotiouk (Russia) Andrei Levine (Russia) Mikhail Biryukov
March 26	Switzerland F3 Futures; Fällanden, Switzerland; Carpet (indoor) $10,000	(United Kingdom) Josh Goodall; 6–4, 6–2	(Austria) Philipp Oswald	(Switzerland) Alexander Sadecky (Hungary) Márton Fucsovics	(Germany) Matthias Kolbe (Germany) Moritz Baumann (France) Teri Groll (Switzerland) Alexander Ritschard
March 26	Switzerland F3 Futures; Fällanden, Switzerland; Carpet (indoor) $10,000	(New Zealand) Marcus Daniell (Hungary) Márton Fucsovics; 6–7^{(3–7)}, 6–3, [10–8]	(Switzerland) Adrian Bodmer (Austria) Philipp Oswald	(Switzerland) Alexander Sadecky (Hungary) Márton Fucsovics	(Germany) Matthias Kolbe (Germany) Moritz Baumann (France) Teri Groll (Switzerland) Alexander Ritschard
March 26	Turkey F12 Futures; Antalya-Belconti, Turkey; Hard $10,000	(Moldova) Radu Albot; 6–1, 6–3	(Spain) Sergio Gutiérrez Ferrol	(Sweden) Patrik Brydolf (Ukraine) Ivan Sergeyev	(Italy) Edoardo Eremin (Russia) Ivan Nedelko (Egypt) Mohamed Safwat (Netherlands) Boy Westerhof
March 26	Turkey F12 Futures; Antalya-Belconti, Turkey; Hard $10,000	(Spain) Ricardo Ojeda Lara (Spain) Oriol Roca Batalla; 6–7^{(5–7)}, 6–1, [10–8]	(Turkey) Haluk Akkoyun (Austria) Richard Ruckelshausen	(Sweden) Patrik Brydolf (Ukraine) Ivan Sergeyev	(Italy) Edoardo Eremin (Russia) Ivan Nedelko (Egypt) Mohamed Safwat (Netherlands) Boy Westerhof
