= Jason Kubler =

Australian tennis player (born 1993)

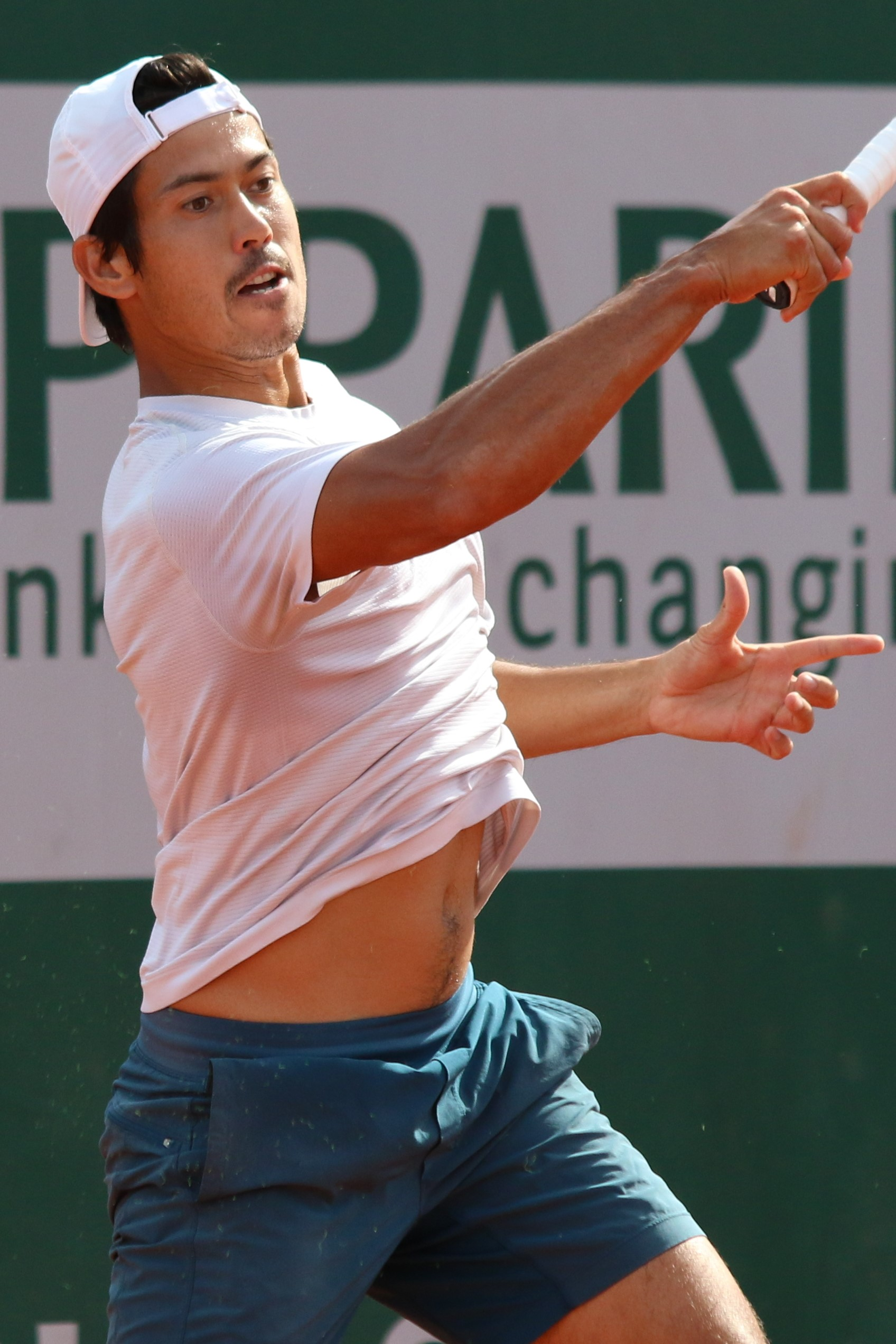
- Kubler at the 2022 French Open
- Country (sports): Australia
- Residence: Brisbane, Queensland, Australia
- Born: 19 May 1993 (age 33) Brisbane, Queensland, Australia
- Height: 1.78 m (5 ft 10 in)
- Turned pro: 2011
- Plays: Right-handed (two-handed backhand)
- Coach: Andrew Harris, Jarrad Bunt, Hayden Bishop, Joel Hennessy, Stephen Huss
- Prize money: US $2,954,661

Singles
- Career record: 28–35
- Career titles: 0
- Highest ranking: No. 63 (24 April 2023)
- Current ranking: No. 179 (2 February 2026)

Grand Slam singles results
- Australian Open: 2R (2023)
- French Open: 2R (2022, 2023)
- Wimbledon: 4R (2022)
- US Open: 2R (2018, 2022)

Doubles
- Career record: 22–22
- Career titles: 1
- Highest ranking: No. 27 (22 May 2023)
- Current ranking: No. 71 (2 February 2026)

Grand Slam doubles results
- Australian Open: W (2023)
- French Open: 1R (2023, 2025)
- Wimbledon: 2R (2023)

Other doubles tournaments
- Tour Finals: RR (2023)

Grand Slam mixed doubles results
- Australian Open: F (2022)
- Wimbledon: 1R (2023)
- Last updated on: 2 February 2026.

Jason Murray Kubler (/ˈkuːblər/ KOOB-lər; born 19 May 1993) is an Australian professional tennis player. He has a career-high ATP singles ranking of world No. 63 achieved on 24 April 2023 and a best doubles ranking of No. 27 reached on 22 May 2023. His best career achievement was a major doubles title at the 2023 Australian Open, with compatriot Rinky Hijikata.

Despite a promising junior career, which included the junior world No. 1 ranking and comparisons to Rafael Nadal, Kubler has spent the majority of his professional career on the lower circuits due to a hereditary knee condition that results in weakened meniscus around the joints. The condition has plagued Kubler throughout his career, resulting in seven knee surgeries. Kubler also spent four years of his professional career playing exclusively on clay courts to avoid further structural damage to his knees.

== Early life ==
Kubler was born in Brisbane, Australia to an Australian father and a Filipina mother. His father, John, introduced Kubler to tennis at the age of five, but died of cancer when Kubler was eight years of age. Kubler grew up in the north Brisbane suburb of Mango Hill with an older brother and a younger sister.

== Junior career ==
In 2009, Kubler became just the second player in history (after Rafael Nadal) to go undefeated through the World Youth Cup and Junior Davis Cup. Following his success at the Junior Davis Cup, Kubler won five titles in a row which saw his junior ranking rise to No. 3 in the world.

Kubler won six junior titles throughout his career and achieved the combined No.1 world ranking in May 2010 with a win–loss record of 67–17 in singles and 40–19 in doubles.

== Professional career ==
=== 2008–13: Early career and injury concerns ===
Kubler made his professional debut in September 2008 at the Australia F7 Futures event on the ITF Men's Circuit, the third tier for men's professional tennis. Kubler won through qualifying to make his main draw professional debut but lost in the first round to compatriot Marinko Matosevic.

In 2010, following continued success on the junior circuit, Kubler was granted wildcards into the Brisbane International and Sydney International qualifying draws, but failed to win a match at either event. He was then awarded a wildcard to make his ATP Tour and Grand Slam debut at the 2010 Australian Open. Drawn against 24th seed Ivan Ljubičić, Kubler was handily beaten 6–2 6–1 6–1 in a lacklustre display.

In April, Kubler won the first main draw professional match of his career at the Australia F3 Futures event in Ipswich, where he went on to make the final, losing to Brydan Klein. Kubler's best results for the remainder of 2010 were a string of semi-final appearances at Netherlands F2, Italy F23, Portugal F5 and Spain F37 Futures events. He finished the season ranked No. 535 in the world.

Kubler missed the start of the 2011 Australian summer of tennis due to a knee injury. Further injuries during the year limited his play before he won the first professional title of his career at the USA F28 Futures event in Birmingham, defeating Yoshihito Nishioka in the final. Kubler won his second professional title the next week at the USA F29 Futures event in Niceville, salvaging an otherwise frustrating year with injury. He finished the 2011 season ranked No. 530 in the world.

Kubler began the 2012 season by entering four Futures tournaments in Florida after again bypassing the Australian summer. Kubler lost in the final of USA F1 to Jack Sock and USA F3 to Brian Baker before winning the USA F4 event in Palm Coast to cap off a promising start to the year. Kubler returned to Australia in March, where he lost the final of the Australia F3 event against Sam Groth but defeated John Millman to claim the Australia F4 title in Bundaberg. Kubler then travelled to Europe, to compete in further Futures tournaments and the first Challenger events of his career, where he made a quarter-final at the Todi Challenger in September. Following more success on the Futures tour, Kubler's world ranking steadily rose, peaking at a career-high No. 268 on 29 October 2012. He ended the 2012 season ranked No. 332 in the world.

In 2013, Kubler played in Futures tournaments throughout the United States, Spain, Great Britain, Australia, Italy and Egypt, but only on clay due to ongoing knee concerns. He won three Futures tournaments for the year, however his ranking dipped to No. 397 to end the season.

=== 2014: Top 150 and exclusive clay court play ===
Kubler again chose to miss the Australian summer of tennis, opting to play Futures events in Egypt and Spain. He entered six tournaments during this stretch, making the final of three and winning one. In March, Kubler qualified for the main draw of Challenger events in Panama and Barranquilla, but failed to win a match at either tournament. In April, he competed in further Challenger events in Savannah and Tallahassee, making the second round at both tournaments. In May, Kubler qualified for the ATP event in Düsseldorf, his first ATP World Tour event since the 2010 Australian Open. He won his first tour-level match by defeating Alessandro Giannessi, before losing to Denis Istomin in the second round. In June, Kubler returned to the Futures circuit and defeated the number one seed Kimmer Coppejans in the final of the Netherlands F3 in Breda. He broke into the top 200 for the first time on 25 August 2014 at No. 197. In September, Kubler made the quarter-final of the Biella Challenger and the following week, he won the Sibiu Challenger defeating Radu Albot in the final. This was the first Challenger title of his career. In November, Kubler reached the final of the Lima Challenger, losing to Guido Pella. On 24 November, Kubler reached a career high ranking of No. 136 before finishing the 2014 season with a world ranking of No. 140. Kubler played a total of 29 tournaments in 14 countries in 2014, all of which were on clay, due to his ongoing knee problems.

=== 2015–16: Rankings decline and further knee injuries ===
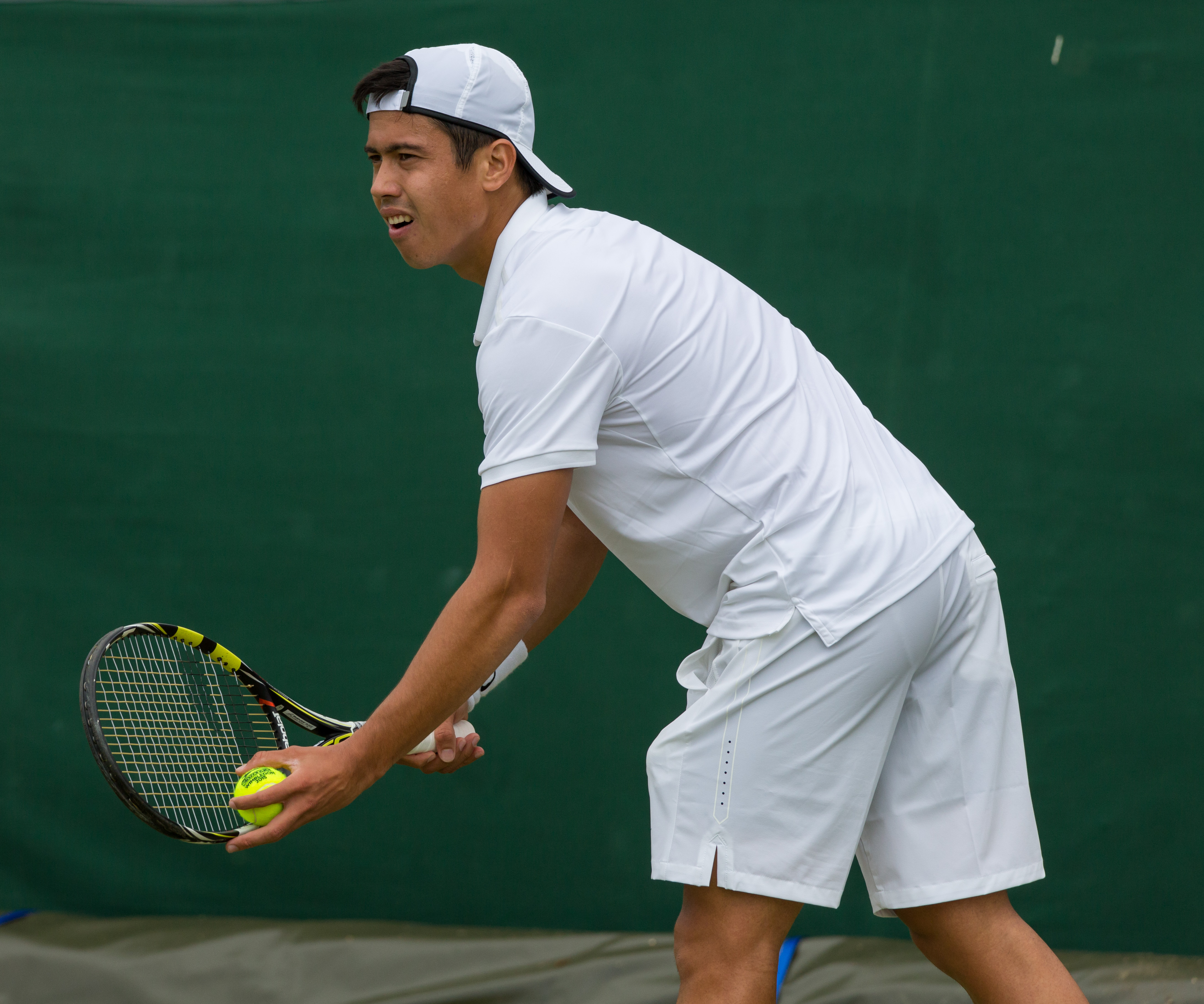
Kubler at the 2015 Wimbledon qualifying tournament

Kubler skipped the Australian summer of tennis for a fifth consecutive year. He instead played a variety of Challenger events across South and North America, his best result being a quarter-final appearance in Sarasota. In May, Kubler attempted to qualify for the French Open, but lost in the first round to Tim Pütz. This was Kubler's first appearance at a Grand Slam event in five years, albeit in the qualifying tournament. In June, Kubler entered the qualifying tournament at Wimbledon, marking his first competitive appearance on the grass in three years. He defeated Rui Machado in straight sets in round 1 but was eliminated in the second round by Aleksandr Nedovyesov, who went on to qualify for the main draw. In September, Kubler attempted to qualify for the US Open, but lost in the opening round to Facundo Bagnis. This was Kubler's first competitive hard court appearance at any professional level in five years. Following the US Open, Kubler underwent knee surgery. A lacklustre year on the court and limited tournament play saw Kubler's ranking freefall to No. 544 to end the 2015 season.

After rehabbing from knee surgery, Kubler commenced the 2016 season by playing several Futures events in North America. He reached the quarter-final of USA F6 and semi-final of USA F8 in February. At USA F9 in March, Kubler retired in the first round. In May, just eight months after his last surgery, Kubler underwent the sixth knee operation of his career which side lined him for the rest of 2016. As a result, Kubler finished the year ranked outside the world's top 1000.

=== 2017: Comeback from injury ===
After a year out of the game and without a world ranking, Kubler returned to professional tennis in March at the Australia F2 and F3 Futures events in Canberra. In the lead up to the events, Kubler was frank about his future in the sport, commenting that another knee operation would likely mark the end of his career. After little success in Canberra, Kubler travelled to Europe in April for Futures events in Spain and Italy. Although Kubler managed to make a semi-final appearance at Spain F12, the highlight of his European trip was a doubles title with compatriot Alex Bolt at the Italy F14 tournament. This was Kubler's first professional trophy of any kind since 2014.

In October, Kubler won through qualifying at the Traralgon ATP Challenger and made a remarkable run to the final after defeating two former top 100 players in Taro Daniel and Matthew Ebden. He defeated Alex Bolt in the final to claim his first Challenger title since 2014, which skyrocketed his ranking inside the world's top 350. Kubler was expected to compete in the Australian Wildcard Playoff in December for a spot in the 2018 Australian Open, but ultimately withdrew alongside a host of top-seeded players. Kubler finished the year ranked No. 341 in the world.

=== 2018: Grand Slam return and Top 100 debut ===
Kubler started his 2018 campaign at the Playford Challenger in South Australia, which he won after qualifying. The victory saw Kubler move inside the world's top 250 for the first time since 2015. Following an impressive run of form and a huge improvement in ranking over the past six months, Kubler was awarded the final wildcard into the 2018 Australian Open, his first Grand Slam appearance in eight years. Kubler faced 10th seed Pablo Carreño Busta in the first round, where he lost in a highly competitive four-set match. Kubler showed plenty of promise in the match, leading by a break in both the first and third sets, but failed to capitalise on his opportunities. Following the Australian Open, Kubler competed in nine Challenger events across Australia and Asia from February to May. His best results through this stretch included three semi-final appearances at the Burnie International, Quijing International and Seoul Open. Kubler improved his world ranking to No. 160 following the Asian swing, his best world ranking in three years.

At the French Open, Kubler lost in the first round of qualifying to Gonçalo Oliveira. Following the French Open, Kubler proceeded to lose in the first round at his next three Challenger tournaments before making a semi-final run at the Ilkey Trophy, where he eventually lost to Oscar Otte. The result saw Kubler return to the world's top 150 for the first time in more than three years.

Kubler then entered the Wimbledon qualifying tournament and showed good form through his first two matches, defeating Arthur De Greef and Adam Pavlásek. In the final round of qualifying, Kubler defeated Canadian journeyman Peter Polansky in four-sets to qualify for the Wimbledon main-draw for the first time in his career. Heading into Wimbledon, Kubler's remarkable comeback journey started to gain attention and his story was captured by the ATP in a video feature titled "The Comeback Story of Jason Kubler". Kubler faced unseeded Argentinian Guido Pella in the first round, where he lost in four close sets. Following Wimbledon, Kubler entered the Winnipeg Challenger. As the fourth seed, Kubler dropped just one-set the whole tournament to claim his second Challenger title of the year, defeating Lucas Miedler in the final. The result saw Kubler move to No. 114 in the ATP rankings, eclipsing the career high he set way back in November 2014. To finish his Canadian tour, Kubler made the semi-final of the Gatineau Challenger before withdrawing from the Granby Challenger with knee soreness.

Kubler then attempted to qualify for the Washington Open, an ATP 500 event. Despite losing in the final round of qualifying, Kubler was granted entry into the main draw as a lucky loser after Nick Kyrgios withdrew with a hip injury. Taking Kyrgios' seeding, Kubler progressed through to the second round via a bye before losing in a third set tie-breaker to fellow Australian James Duckworth. In August, Kubler was granted a reciprocal wildcard into the US Open. In the lead up to the tournament, Kubler competed in the Vancouver Open on the Challenger circuit, where he was defeated by Dan Evans in the final. The result propelled Kubler into the top 100 for the first time, marking an 841 place ranking rise in the past 12 months. At the US Open, Kubler upset 19th seed Roberto Bautista Agut in straight sets in the first round to claim the first main draw grand slam win of his career. In the second round, Kubler was forced to retire in the fourth-set against American Taylor Fritz after rolling his ankle, which inadvertently caused further problems with his knees.

Kubler finished the season ranked No. 114 in the world.

=== 2019: Early struggles, rankings decline and injury ===
Kubler was expected to compete in the Brisbane International, but withdrew from the event due to knee soreness. Kubler then attempted to qualify for the Sydney International, but fell in the first round to third seed Yoshihito Nishioka. For the second consecutive year, Kubler was awarded a wildcard into the 2019 Australian Open. With limited tournament preparation, Kubler was defeated in the first round of the Australian Open by unseeded Italian Thomas Fabbiano in four sets.

Following a three-month break from the tour due to knee ailments, Kubler returned in mid-April at the Kunming Challenger where he was defeated by James Duckworth in the third round. At the 2019 French Open, Kubler attempted to qualify but was defeated in the second round by Viktor Troicki. At Wimbledon, Kubler won through his first two matches in qualifying but fell at the last hurdle to Yasutaka Uchiyama in five sets. Following his poor results, Kubler's ranking dipped to No. 211 in the world. In July, Kubler made back-to-back finals on the Challenger tour in Winnetka and Gatineau. Kubler lost the Winnetka final to top-seeded American Bradley Klahn but bounced back to win the Gatineau tournament without dropping a set. The result helped steer Kubler back inside the top 200 at No. 189 in the ATP rankings. Kubler was expected to contest the Challenger event in Granby, but withdrew due to a wrist injury.

Kubler played no further tournaments in 2019 and finished with the year ranked No. 261 in the world.

=== 2020–21: Limited play due to COVID-19 pandemic, sixth Challenger title ===
Following a first-round exit in Australian Open qualifying, Kubler made a run to the semi-final of the Burnie Challenger before losing to Yannick Hanfmann in straight sets. Kubler played three further Challenger events before the Tour was suspended until the end of July due to the COVID-19 pandemic. Kubler returned to Australia following the suspension and predominately played tournaments in the UTR Pro Tennis Series. He ended the 2020 season ranked No. 259 in the world.

Kubler started the 2021 season at the Murray River Open on the ATP Tour after receiving a wildcard entry. At the tournament he scored an upset victory over 9th seeded Italian Lorenzo Sonego in three sets, his first in an ATP main draw since the 2018 US Open. He lost in the second round to Ričardas Berankis. Kubler then attempted to qualify for the 2021 Australian Open, but was defeated in the second round by Sergiy Stakhovsky.

In July, he reached the final of the Nur-Sultan II Challenger, but retired early in the second set against Andrey Kuznetsov. The following week at the Lexington Challenger Kubler won the sixth Challenger title of his career, defeating Alejandro Tabilo in three-sets.

In August 2021, Kubler tested positive for COVID-19. He returned to the tour in September, but failed to progress beyond the second round in any tournament for the remainder of the season.

Kubler ended 2021 ranked No. 206 in the world.

=== 2022: Wimbledon fourth round, Grand Slam mixed doubles final, and first Top 10 victory ===
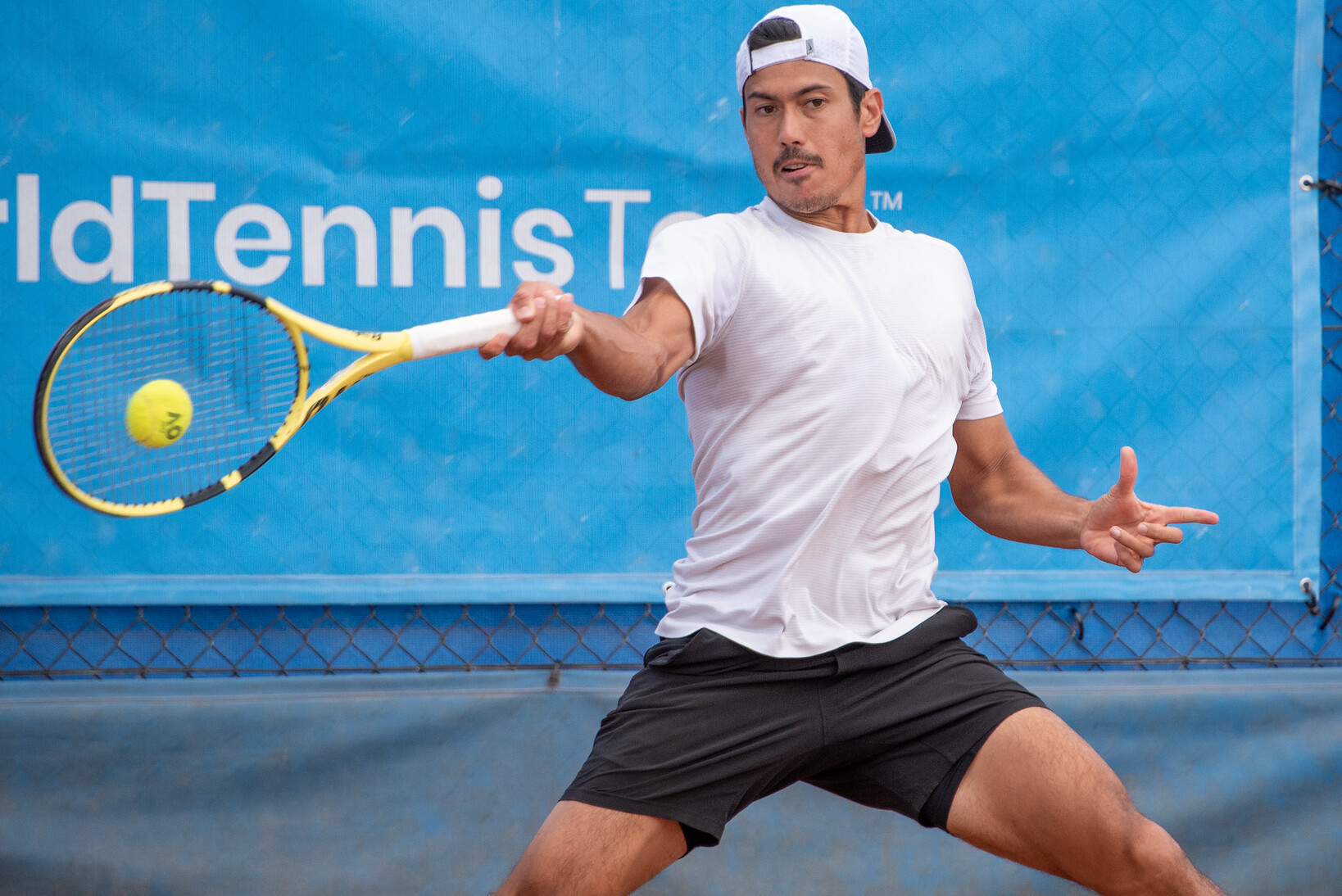
Kubler during the ITF M25 tournament played in Canberra

Kubler attempted to qualify for the 2022 Australian Open, but was eliminated in the second round by Tomás Martín Etcheverry. Kubler was awarded a pair of wildcards into the doubles and mixed doubles events however, with compatriots Christopher O'Connell and Jaimee Fourlis respectively. Kubler and O'Connell reached the third round as a pairing before withdrawing from the event. In the mixed doubles event, Kubler and Fourlis went on a fairy tale run to make the final and were bidding to become the first all-Australian duo to win the mixed doubles championship since 2013, but were ultimately defeated by fifth seeds Kristina Mladenovic and Ivan Dodig.

In late March and early April, Kubler won back-to-back Futures events in Canberra and in May made the semi-final of the Zagreb Challenger. The results steered his ranking inside the top 200.

On his 29th birthday, Kubler qualified for the main draw of the 2022 French Open for the first time, and was the only Australian to qualify at the 2022 event. Kubler scored his first main draw Grand Slam win since the 2018 US Open when he defeated Denis Kudla in straight sets. He lost in the second round to 10th seed Cameron Norrie. Kubler moved to No. 119 in the world following Roland Garros.

In June, Kubler won the seventh Challenger title of his career at Little Rock, defeating Taiwan's Wu Tung-lin in the final. The following week he reached the final of the Orlando Challenger, but retired during the third-set due to stomach issues. The results propelled Kubler back in the top 100 for the first time since October 2018, when he peaked at world No. 91.

After narrowly missing out on direct entry into Wimbledon, Kubler entered the qualifying tournament as the second seed. He needed a deciding set in his first two matches to progress, but cruised past Elias Ymer in straight sets during the final round to confirm his place in the main draw. It was the second time Kubler qualified for Wimbledon, having done so in 2018. Kubler faced British 28th seed Dan Evans in the first round, defeating the home crowd favourite in straight sets. This was Kubler's first main draw win at Wimbledon in his career. In the second round, he defeated fellow qualifier Dennis Novak in straight sets to reach the third round of a Grand Slam for the first time in his career. His dream run continued in the third round, defeating Jack Sock in five sets to reach the second week of a Grand Slam for the first time. In the fourth round, Kubler was defeated by 11th seeded American Taylor Fritz in straight sets. Kubler's result at Wimbledon earned him the biggest payday of his career, taking home £190,000 (US$230,000). Despite his fourth round appearance, Kubler slid outside the top 100 due to the removal of ranking points at the 2022 Championships. The ATP, WTA and ITF all stripped the tournament of ranking points, following the All England Lawn Tennis Club's decision to ban Russian and Belarusian players from competing.

At the Hall of Fame Open Kubler defeated compatriot Jordan Thompson in straight sets in the first round. He then defeated top seed and World No. 9 Félix Auger-Aliassime in three sets to reach his first ATP quarterfinal, saving a match point in the process during the final set tiebreak. The victory over Auger-Aliassime also marked his first career Top 10 win. He then defeated compatriot James Duckworth in straight sets to reach his maiden ATP semifinal, where he lost to 3rd seed Alexander Bublik. Later that month, at the 2022 Atlanta Open, Kubler reached the final in doubles with compatriot John Peers, but lost to second seeded Australian duo Thanasi Kokkinakis and Nick Kyrgios.

At the US Open, Kubler defeated Mikael Ymer in four sets in the first round, his first main draw win at the event since 2018. In the second round, Kubler was defeated by American 22nd seed and eventual semi-finalist Frances Tiafoe in straight sets. In September, at the San Diego Open, Kubler reached his second ATP doubles final of the season, this time with fellow Australian Luke Saville. They lost in the final to American duo Nathaniel Lammons and Jackson Withrow in straight sets.

Kubler finished the 2022 season ranked No. 107 in the world, the best end-of-year ranking of his career.

=== 2023: Grand Slam doubles title, Masters 1000 debut, and career-high rankings ===
Kubler began his 2023 season representing Australia at the inaugural 2023 United Cup, following the withdrawal of Nick Kyrgios. During the group stage, he recorded singles victories over world No. 27 Dan Evans and world No. 39 Albert Ramos Viñolas. Despite his contributions, Australia did not advance beyond the group stage. Kubler’s performance, however, saw him return to the top 100, reaching a then-career-high singles ranking of No. 86. At the Adelaide International 2 tournament, Kubler reentered the main draw as a wildcard and defeated Tomás Martín Etcheverry in the first round before falling to sixth seed Miomir Kecmanovic in three tight sets.

At the Australian Open, Kubler made his first main draw appearance at the tournament in four years after receiving a wildcard entry. In the first round, he secured his first main draw victory at the event, 13 years after his tournament debut, by defeating Sebastián Báez in straight sets. He exited the tournament after losing in the second round to 18th seed Karen Khachanov. In the doubles event, Kubler partnered with fellow Australian Rinky Hijikata. Entering the tournament as wildcards, the pair made a remarkable run to the title, defeating three seeded teams: sixth seeds Lloyd Glasspool and Harri Heliövaara, top seeds Wesley Koolhof and Neal Skupski, and eighth seeds Marcel Granollers and Horacio Zeballos. They also saved a match point in the third round against Tomislav Brkić and Gonzalo Escobar. In the final, they overcame Hugo Nys and Jan Zieliński to win their maiden Grand Slam title. Kubler and Hijikata became only the fifth unseeded team, and just the second wildcard pairing, to win the Australian Open men’s doubles title in the Open Era. The victory propelled Kubler 130 places up the doubles rankings to a career-high of No. 33. He also reached a new career-best singles ranking of No. 79 following the tournament.

In March, Kubler made his Masters 1000 debut at the BNP Paribas Open in Indian Wells. He defeated Lorenzo Sonego in the first round and advanced past 21st seed Grigor Dimitrov, who retired during their match, before falling to 14th seed Frances Tiafoe in the third round.

In April, Kubler reached the quarterfinals of the U.S. Men's Clay Court Championships in Houston, recording wins over Fernando Verdasco and Daniel Elahi Galán. Following the 2023 Barcelona Open, he reached a career-high singles ranking of No. 63 on 24 April. In doubles, he partnered with his compatriot Alex de Minaur to reach the quarterfinals at the Italian Open, climbing to a new career-high doubles ranking of No. 27 following the tournament.

At the French Open, Kubler won his first-round match before being defeated in straight sets by Fabio Fognini in the second round. In June, he captured his eighth career Challenger title at the Ilkley Trophy, defeating third seed Sebastian Ofner in the final.

Kubler’s US Open campaign was cut short when he retired from his first-round match against Matteo Arnaldi due to a right knee injury. He returned later in the season to compete in the doubles event at the ATP Finals in Turin alongside Hijikata. The duo, however, were unable to progress past the round-robin stage.

Kubler concluded the season with career-high year-end ATP rankings of No. 102 in singles and No. 30 in doubles.

=== 2024: Further injuries ===
Kubler commenced his 2024 season at the Brisbane International, losing in the second round to Rafael Nadal in straight sets. At the Australian Open, Kubler entered as a wildcard and battled through a gruelling five-set epic lasting four hours and 59 minutes, ultimately falling to Daniel Elahi Galán in the first round.

After being sidelined for 10 months due to ongoing knee issues, Kubler made his return to competition on the ITF World Tennis Tour in November. He played two events in Brisbane and Carrara, making the final in the latter.

As a result of his extended absence from competition, Kubler's world ranking dropped sharply, finishing the year at No. 638 in singles, his lowest year-end ranking since 2016.

=== 2025: Ranking improvement and 9th Challenger title ===
Kubler attempted to qualify for the 2025 Australian Open but fell in the opening round to Thiago Monteiro, causing his ranking to tumble outside the Top 800. With limited opportunities at higher-level events, he turned to the ITF World Tennis Tour, where he found immediate success. In February and March, he claimed back-to-back titles in Burnie and Launceston, the latter capped by a win over Cruz Hewitt, son of Australian tennis legend Lleyton Hewitt in the final. Kubler’s resurgence continued in April with his ninth career Challenger title in Gwanju, followed by another ITF title in Baotou. His impressive run of form sparked a remarkable rise in the rankings, surging more than 600 places to reach No. 210 in just four months.

In May, Kubler attempted to qualify for the French Open but was defeated in the second round of qualifying by James Trotter.

== Performance timelines ==
Key
W	F	SF	QF	#R	RR	Q#	DNQ	A	NH

(W) winner; (F) finalist; (SF) semifinalist; (QF) quarterfinalist; (#R) rounds 4, 3, 2, 1; (RR) round-robin stage; (Q#) qualification round; (DNQ) did not qualify; (A) absent; (NH) not held; (SR) strike rate (events won / competed); (W–L) win–loss record.
To avoid confusion and double counting, these charts are updated at the conclusion of a tournament or when the player's participation has ended.

=== Singles ===
Current through the 2026 Australian Open

Tournament	2010	2011	2012	2013	2014	2015	2016	2017	2018	2019	2020	2021	2022	2023	2024	2025	2026	SR	W–L	Win %
Grand Slam tournaments
Australian Open	1R	A	A	A	A	A	A	A	1R	1R	Q1	Q2	Q2	2R	1R	Q1	1R	0 / 6	1–6	14%
French Open	A	A	A	A	A	Q1	A	A	Q1	Q2	A	A	2R	2R	A	Q2		0 / 2	2–2	50%
Wimbledon	A	A	A	A	A	Q2	A	A	1R	Q3	NH	A	4R	2R	A	A		0 / 3	4–3	57%
US Open	A	A	A	A	A	Q1	A	A	2R	A	A	A	2R	1R	A	Q3		0 / 3	2–3	40%
Win–loss	0–1	0–0	0–0	0–0	0–0	0–0	0–0	0–0	1–3	0–1	0–0	0–0	5–3	3–4	0–1	0–0	0–1	0 / 14	9–14	39%
National representation
Davis Cup	A	A	A	A	A	A	A	A	A	A	A	A	F	A	A	A		0 / 1	1–1	50%
ATP 1000 tournaments
Indian Wells Open	A	A	A	A	A	A	A	A	A	A	NH	Q1	A	3R	A	A		0 / 1	2–1	67%
Miami Open	A	A	A	A	A	A	A	A	A	A	NH	A	A	1R	A	A		0 / 1	0–1	0%
Monte-Carlo Masters	A	A	A	A	A	A	A	A	A	A	NH	A	A	A	A	A		0 / 0	0–0	0%
Madrid Open	A	A	A	A	A	A	A	A	A	A	NH	A	A	1R	A	A		0 / 1	0–1	0%
Italian Open	A	A	A	A	A	A	A	A	A	A	A	A	A	2R	A	A		0 / 1	1–1	50%
Canadian Open	A	A	A	A	A	A	A	A	A	A	NH	A	Q1	A	A	A		0 / 0	0–0	–
Cincinnati Open	A	A	A	A	A	A	A	A	A	A	A	A	A	Q2	A	A		0 / 0	0–0	–
Shanghai Masters	A	A	A	A	A	A	A	A	A	A	NH			A	A	Q2		0 / 0	0–0	–
Paris Masters	A	A	A	A	A	A	A	A	A	A	A	A	A	A	A	A		0 / 0	0–0	–
Win–loss	0–0	0–0	0–0	0–0	0–0	0–0	0–0	0–0	0–0	0–0	0–0	0–0	0–0	3–4	0–0	0–0	0–0	0 / 4	3–4	43%
Career statistics
	2010	2011	2012	2013	2014	2015	2016	2017	2018	2019	2020	2021	2022	2023	2024	2025	2026	Career		
Tournaments	1	0	0	0	1	0	0	0	4	1	0	1	8	15	2	0	2	34		
Overall win–loss	0–1	0–0	0–0	0–0	1–1	0–0	0–0	0–0	1–4	0–1	0–0	1–1	11–9	13–15	1–2	0–0	1–1	29–35		
Year-end ranking	535	530	332	397	140	544	1060	341	113	261	259	206	107	102	819	195		45%		

=== Doubles ===
Tournament	2010	2011	2012	2013	2014	2015	2016	2017	2018	2019	2020	2021	2022	2023	2024	2025	2026	SR	W–L	Win %
Grand Slam tournaments
Australian Open	1R	A	A	A	A	A	A	A	A	A	A	A	3R (Note: Kubler and O'Connell withdrew before the third round of the 2022 Australian Open which does not count as a loss.)	W	2R	1R	F	1 / 6	14–4	78%
French Open	A	A	A	A	A	A	A	A	A	A	A	A	A	1R	A	1R		0 / 2	0–2	0%
Wimbledon	A	A	A	A	A	A	A	A	A	A	NH	A	A	2R	A	A		0 / 1	1–1	50%
US Open	A	A	A	A	A	A	A	A	A	A	A	A	A	A	A	A		0 / 0	0–0	–
Win–loss	0–1	0–0	0–0	0–0	0–0	0–0	0–0	0–0	0–0	0–0	0–0	0–0	2–0	7–2	1–1	0–2	5–1	1 / 8	15–7	68%
Year-end championship
ATP Finals	Did not qualify													RR	DNQ			0 / 1	0–3	0%
ATP 1000 tournaments
Indian Wells Open	A	A	A	A	A	A	A	A	A	A	NH	A	A	1R	A	A		0 / 1	0–1	0%
Miami Open	A	A	A	A	A	A	A	A	A	A	NH	A	A	1R	A	A		0 / 1	0–1	0%
Madrid Open	A	A	A	A	A	A	A	A	A	A	NH	A	A	1R	A	A		0 / 1	0–1	0%
Italian Open	A	A	A	A	A	A	A	A	A	A	A	A	A	QF	A	A		0 / 1	2–1	67%
Win–loss	0–0	0–0	0–0	0–0	0–0	0–0	0–0	0–0	0–0	0–0	0–0	0–0	0–0	2–4	0–0	0–0		0 / 4	2–4	33%
Career statistics
	2010	2011	2012	2013	2014	2015	2016	2017	2018	2019	2020	2021	2022	2023	2024	2025	2026	Career		
Tournaments	1	0	0	0	0	0	0	0	0	0	0	1	4	7	2	3	1	22		
Titles	0	0	0	0	0	0	0	0	0	0	0	0	0	1	0	0	0	1		
Finals	0	0	0	0	0	0	0	0	0	0	0	0	2	1	0	0	1	4		
Overall win–loss	0–1	0–0	0–0	0–0	0–0	0–0	0–0	0–0	0–0	0–0	0–0	0–1	8–3	11–13	1–2	2–2	5–1	27–23		
Year-end ranking	1310	–	–	817	532	–	–	681	320	–	1156	580	160	29	557	753		54%		

== Grand Slam tournaments finals ==
=== Doubles: 2 (1 title, 1 runner-up) ===
Result	Year	Tournament	Surface	Partner	Opponents	Score
Win	2023	Australian Open	Hard	(Australia) Rinky Hijikata	(Monaco) Hugo Nys (Poland) Jan Zieliński	6–4, 7–6^{(7–4)}
Loss	2026	Australian Open	Hard	(Australia) Marc Polmans	(United States) Christian Harrison (United Kingdom) Neal Skupski	6–7^{(4–7)}, 4–6

=== Mixed doubles: 1 (runner-up) ===
Result	Year	Tournament	Surface	Partner	Opponents	Score
Loss	2022	Australian Open	Hard	(Australia) Jaimee Fourlis	(France) Kristina Mladenovic (Croatia) Ivan Dodig	3–6, 4–6

== ATP Tour finals ==
=== Doubles: 4 (1 title, 3 runner-ups) ===
Legend Grand Slam (1–1) ATP Finals (–) ATP 1000 (–) ATP 500 (–) ATP 250 (0–2)	Finals by surface Hard (1–3) Clay (–) Grass (–)	Finals by setting Outdoor (1–3) Indoor (–)

Result	W–L	Date	Tournament	Tier	Surface	Partner	Opponents	Score
Loss	0–1	Jul 2022	Atlanta Open, US	ATP 250	Hard	(Australia) John Peers	(Australia) Thanasi Kokkinakis (Australia) Nick Kyrgios	6–7^{(4–7)}, 5–7
Loss	0–2	Sep 2022	San Diego Open, US	ATP 250	Hard	(Australia) Luke Saville	(United States) Nathaniel Lammons (United States) Jackson Withrow	6–7^{(5–7)}, 2–6
Win	1–2	Jan 2023	Australian Open, Australia	Grand Slam	Hard	(Australia) Rinky Hijikata	(Monaco) Hugo Nys (Poland) Jan Zieliński	6–4, 7–6^{(7–4)}
Loss	1–3	Jan 2026	Australian Open, Australia	Grand Slam	Hard	(Australia) Marc Polmans	(United States) Christian Harrison (United Kingdom) Neal Skupski	6–7^{(4–7)}, 4–6

== ATP Challenger and ITF Tour finals ==
=== Singles: 43 (25 titles, 18 runner-ups) ===
Legend ATP Challenger Tour (9–6) ITF Futures/WTT (16–12)	Finals by surface Hard (10–8) Clay (14–10) Grass (1–0)

Result	W–L	Date	Tournament	Tier	Surface	Opponent	Score
Win	1–0	Sep 2014	Sibiu Open, Romania	Challenger	Clay	(Moldova) Radu Albot	6–4, 6–1
Loss	1–1	Nov 2014	Lima Challenger, Peru	Challenger	Clay	(Argentina) Guido Pella	2–6, 4–6
Win	2–1	Oct 2017	Traralgon Challenger, Australia	Challenger	Hard	(Australia) Alex Bolt	2–6, 7–6^{(8–6)}, 7–6^{(7–3)}
Win	3–1	Jan 2018	Playford International, Australia	Challenger	Hard	(Canada) Brayden Schnur	6–4, 6–2
Win	4–1	Jul 2018	Winnipeg Challenger, Canada	Challenger	Hard	(Austria) Lucas Miedler	6–1, 6–1
Loss	4–2	Jul 2018	Vancouver Open, Canada	Challenger	Hard	(United Kingdom) Dan Evans	6–4, 5–7, 6–7^{(3–7)}
Loss	4–3	Jul 2019	Nielson Pro Championships, US	Challenger	Hard	(United States) Bradley Klahn	2–6, 5–7
Win	5–3	Jul 2019	Gatineau Challenger, Canada	Challenger	Hard	(France) Enzo Couacaud	6–4, 6–4
Loss	5–4	Jul 2021	President's Cup, Kazakhstan	Challenger	Hard	(Russia) Andrey Kuznetsov	3–6, 1–2 ret.
Win	6–4	Jul 2021	Lexington Challenger, US	Challenger	Hard	(Chile) Alejandro Tabilo	7–5, 6–7^{(2–7)}, 7–5
Win	7–4	Jun 2022	Little Rock Challenger, US	Challenger	Hard	(Chinese Taipei) Wu Tung-lin	6–0, 6–2
Loss	7–5	Jun 2022	Orlando Open, US	Challenger	Hard	(China) Wu Yibing	7–6^{(7–5)}, 4–6, 1–3 ret.
Win	8–5	Jun 2023	Ilkley Trophy, United Kingdom	Challenger	Grass	(Austria) Sebastian Ofner	6–4, 6–4
Loss	8–6	Feb 2025	Queensland International, Australia	Challenger	Hard	(Australia) Adam Walton	6–7^{(6–8)}, 6–7^{(4–7)}
Win	9–6	Apr 2025	Gwangju Open, South Korea	Challenger	Hard	Alibek Kachmazov	7–5, 6–7^{(7–9)}, 6–3
Loss	0–1	May 2010	F3 Ipswich, Australia	Futures	Clay	(Australia) Brydan Klein	3–6, 4–6
Win	1–1	Oct 2011	F28 Birmingham, US	Futures	Clay	(Japan) Yoshihito Nishioka	6–3, 6–2
Win	2–1	Nov 2011	F29 Niceville, US	Futures	Clay	(Czech Republic) Roman Vögeli	6–2, 6–4
Loss	2–2	Jan 2012	F1 Plantation, US	Futures	Clay	(United States) Jack Sock	1–6, 6–7^{(5–7)}
Loss	2–3	Jan 2012	F3 Weston, US	Futures	Clay	(United States) Brian Baker	5–7, 3–6
Win	3–3	Feb 2012	F4 Palm Coast, US	Futures	Clay	(United States) Rhyne Williams	6–2, 6–3
Loss	3–4	Mar 2012	F3 Ipswich, Australia	Futures	Clay	(Australia) Samuel Groth	7–5, 3–6, 2–6
Win	4–4	Apr 2012	F4 Bundaberg, Australia	Futures	Clay	(Australia) John Millman	6–4, 1–6, 6–1
Loss	4–5	Jul 2012	F25 Izmir, Turkey	Futures	Clay	(Italy) Lorenzo Giustino	4–6, 6–3, 5–7
Loss	4–6	Sep 2012	F30 Sevilla, Spain	Futures	Clay	(Spain) Gerard Granollers Pujol	0–6, 6–4, 1–6
Loss	4–7	Mar 2013	F5 Bundaberg, Australia	Futures	Clay	(Australia) James Duckworth	6–7^{(9–11)}, 2–6
Win	5–7	Apr 2013	F4 Padova, Italy	Futures	Clay	(Spain) Jordi Samper Montaña	6–1, 6–4
Win	6–7	Nov 2013	F37 Madrid, Spain	Futures	Clay	(Germany) Jean-Marc Werner	7–6^{(7–5)}, 6–0
Win	7–7	Dec 2013	F36 Sharm El Sheikh, Egypt	Futures	Clay	(Egypt) Sherif Sabry	7–5, 6–3
Loss	7–8	Feb 2014	F3 Sharm El Sheikh, Egypt	Futures	Clay	(Italy) Stefano Travaglia	0–6, 0–6
Win	8–8	Feb 2014	F1 Paguera, Spain	Futures	Clay	(Germany) Peter Heller	6–4, 6–4
Loss	8–9	Feb 2014	F2 Paguera, Spain	Futures	Clay	(Spain) Oriol Roca Batalla	6–2, 3–6, 3–6
Win	9–9	Jun 2014	F3 Breda, Netherlands	Futures	Clay	(Belgium) Kimmer Coppejans	6–3, 6–7^{(8–6)}, 6–3
Win	10–9	Jul 2014	F24 Fano, Italy	Futures	Clay	(Italy) Daniele Giorgini	6–1, 5–7, 6–3
Loss	10–10	Oct 2017	F6 Toowoomba, Australia	Futures	Hard	(Australia) Andrew Harris	4–6, 0–6
Loss	10–11	Oct 2017	F7 Cairns, Australia	Futures	Hard	(Australia) Dayne Kelly	3–6, 6–7
Win	11–11	Jun 2021	M15 Champaign, United States	WTT	Hard	(Canada) Gabriel Diallo	6–2, 6–1
Win	12–11	Mar 2022	M25 Canberra, Australia	WTT	Clay	(Australia) Tristan Schoolkate	7–6(7–3), 6–1
Win	13–11	Apr 2022	M25 Canberra 2, Australia	WTT	Clay	(Australia) Omar Jasika	1–6, 6–3, 7–6^{(7–4)}
Loss	13–12	Dec 2024	M25 Carrara, Australia	WTT	Hard	(Australia) Matthew Dellavedova	6–3, 3–6, 2–6
Win	14–12	Feb 2025	M25 Burnie, Australia	WTT	Hard	(Australia) Omar Jasika	6–3, 6–2
Win	15–12	Mar 2025	M25 Launceston, Australia	WTT	Hard	(Australia) Cruz Hewitt	6–2, 6–4
Win	16–12	May 2025	M25 Baotou, China	WTT	Clay	(China) Bai Yan	6–1, 6–1

=== Doubles: 7 (6 titles, 1 runner-up) ===
Legend ATP Challenger Tour (1–1) ITF Futures/WTT (5–0)	Finals by surface Hard (0–1) Clay (6–0)

Result	W–L	Date	Tournament	Tier	Surface	Partner	Opponents	Score
Loss	0–1	Jan 2018	Playford International, Australia	Challenger	Hard	(Australia) Maverick Banes	(United States) Mackenzie McDonald (United States) Tommy Paul	6–7^{(4–7)}, 4–6
Win	1–1	May 2023	Open du Pays d'Aix, France	Challenger	Clay	(Australia) John Peers	(Portugal) Nuno Borges (Portugal) Francisco Cabral	6–7^{(5–7)}, 6–4, [10–7]
Win	1–0	Oct 2013	F35 El Prat de Llobregat, Spain	Futures	Clay	(Spain) Pol Toledo Bagué	(Venezuela) Jordi Muñoz Abreu (Netherlands) Mark Vervoort	6–2, 4–6, [10–6]
Win	2–0	Dec 2013	F36 Sharm El Sheikh, Egypt	Futures	Clay	(Germany) Jean-Marc Werner	(Ukraine) Dmytro Badanov (Russia) Yan Sabanin	7–6^{(7–2)}, 7–6^{(8–6)}
Win	3–0	Feb 2014	F2 Peguera, Spain	Futures	Clay	(Spain) Pol Toledo Bagué	(Spain) Oriol Roca Batalla (Germany) Jean-Marc Werner	6–1, 6–3
Win	4–0	Mar 2014	F5 Reus, Spain	Futures	Clay	(Spain) Pol Toledo Bagué	(Spain) Ivan Gómez Mantilla (Portugal) Gonçalo Oliveira	6–4, 6–1
Win	5–0	May 2017	F14 Frascati, Italy	Futures	Clay	(Australia) Alex Bolt	(Italy) Federico Maccari (Italy) Andrea Vavassori	6–1, 7–6^{(8–6)}

== Wins over top 10 players ==
- Kubler has a 1–1 record against players who were ranked in the top 10 at the time the match was played.

Season	2022	2023	Total
Wins	1	0	1

#	Player	Rank	Event	Surface	Rd	Score	JKR
2022
1.	(Canada) Félix Auger-Aliassime	9	Hall of Fame Newport Open, US	Grass	2R	4–6, 6–3, 7–6^{(7–4)}	102
