= 2011 Aegon International – Men's singles qualifying =

The qualifying singles of the 2011 Aegon International took place from June 13th to 18th, 2011 in Eastbourne, Great Britain.

== Players ==
=== Seeds ===
1. (Germany) Rainer Schüttler (qualified)
2. (Ukraine) Illya Marchenko (qualifying competition)
3. (United States) Donald Young (qualified)
4. (Brazil) Júlio Silva (first round)
5. (Russia) Andrey Kuznetsov (second round)
6. (Romania) Marius Copil (qualifying competition)
7. (Ukraine) Sergei Bubka (first round)
8. (Russia) Denis Matsukevich (qualifying competition)

=== Qualifiers ===
1. (Germany) Rainer Schüttler
2. (Russia) Evgeny Kirillov
3. (United States) Donald Young
4. (United Kingdom) Alexander Slabinsky

== Qualifying draw ==
=== First qualifier ===
First round
1	(Germany) Rainer Schüttler	6	6
(United Kingdom) Matthew Short	3	2
(Slovenia) Luka Gregorc	6	4	6^{9}
(United Kingdom) Marcus Willis	4	6	7^{11}
(United States) Jordan Cox	7	7
(United Kingdom) Richard Bloomfield	5	5
WC	(United Kingdom) Oliver Golding	6^{6}	7	4
6	(Romania) Marius Copil	7^{8}	5	6

Second round
1	(Germany) Rainer Schüttler	7	6
(United Kingdom) Marcus Willis	5	3
(United States) Jordan Cox	7^{7}	2	2
6	(Romania) Marius Copil	6^{5}	6	6

Qualifying competition
1	(Germany) Rainer Schüttler	6	6
6	(Romania) Marius Copil	4	3

=== Second qualifier ===
First round
2	(Ukraine) Illya Marchenko	7	5	6
(Sweden) Michael Ryderstedt	5	7	4
(United Kingdom) Lewis Burton	3	6	7^{7}
(Republic of Ireland) Barry King	6	2	6^{4}
(United Kingdom) David Rice	3	3
(Russia) Evgeny Kirillov	6	6
WC	(United Kingdom) George Morgan	4	0
5	(Russia) Andrey Kuznetsov	6	6

Second round
2	(Ukraine) Illya Marchenko	6	3	6
(United Kingdom) Lewis Burton	4	6	3
(Russia) Evgeny Kirillov	6	6
5	(Russia) Andrey Kuznetsov	1	3

Qualifying competition
2	(Ukraine) Illya Marchenko	4	6	2
(Russia) Evgeny Kirillov	6	0	6

=== Third qualifier ===
First round
3	(United States) Donald Young	6	6^{5}	6
(Australia) Benjamin Mitchell	1	7^{7}	3
(United Kingdom) Chris Eaton	5	7^{7}	5
(Mexico) Santiago González	7	6^{4}	7
(United Kingdom) Joshua Goodall	3	6	4
(United Kingdom) Joshua Milton	6	3	6
(United States) Denis Kudla	6^{4}	6	6
7	(Ukraine) Sergei Bubka	7^{7}	4	3

Second round
3	(United States) Donald Young	7^{7}	6
(Mexico) Santiago González	6^{3}	4
(United Kingdom) Joshua Milton	1	4
(United States) Denis Kudla	6	6

Qualifying competition
3	(United States) Donald Young	6	6
(United States) Denis Kudla	3	1

=== Fourth qualifier ===
First round
4	(Brazil) Júlio Silva	6^{10}	3
(United Kingdom) Sean Thornley	7^{12}	6
(United Kingdom) Alexander Slabinsky	7^{7}	6
(United Kingdom) James Feaver	6^{3}	1
WC	(United Kingdom) James Marsalek	6	6
WC	(United Kingdom) Toby Martin	2	4
(United States) Nicholas Monroe	4	1
8	(Russia) Denis Matsukevich	6	6

Second round
(United Kingdom) Sean Thornley	6^{5}	3
(United Kingdom) Alexander Slabinsky	7^{7}	6
WC	(United Kingdom) James Marsalek	6^{1}	5
8	(Russia) Denis Matsukevich	7^{7}	7

Qualifying competition
(United Kingdom) Alexander Slabinsky	6	2	7^{7}
8	(Russia) Denis Matsukevich	1	6	6^{4}
