= 2010 ITF Men's Circuit (April–June) =

The 2010 ITF Men's Circuit is the 2010 edition of the third-tier tour for men's professional tennis. It is organised by the International Tennis Federation and is a tier below the ATP Challenger Tour. During the months of April 2010 and June 2010 over 150 tournaments were played with the majority being played in the month of May.

== Key ==
$15,000 tournaments
$10,000 tournaments

== April ==
Week of	Tournament	Winner	Runners-up	Semifinalists	Quarterfinalists
April 5	China F3 Futures; Chongqing, China; Hard $15,000	(China) Wu Di; 7–5 retired	(Croatia) Marin Bradarić	(Austria) Nikolaus Moser (United Kingdom) Sean Thornley	(South Korea) Daniel Yoo (China) Chang Yu (China) Li Zhe (France) Fabrice Martin
April 5	China F3 Futures; Chongqing, China; Hard $15,000	(China) Wu Di (China) Zhang Ze; 6–3, 1–6, [10–8]	(China) Gong Maoxin (China) Li Zhe	(Austria) Nikolaus Moser (United Kingdom) Sean Thornley	(South Korea) Daniel Yoo (China) Chang Yu (China) Li Zhe (France) Fabrice Martin
April 5	Korea F1 Futures; Seogwipo, South Korea; Hard $15,000	(Finland) Harri Heliövaara; 6–4, 6–2	(Romania) Teodor-Dacian Crăciun	(Japan) Junn Mitsuhashi (South Korea) Jun Woong-sun	(South Korea) Kim Hyun-joon (Australia) Adam Feeney (France) Ludovic Walter (South Korea) Jeong Suk-young
April 5	Korea F1 Futures; Seogwipo, South Korea; Hard $15,000	(South Korea) An Jae-sung (South Korea) Lee Chul-hee; 7–6^{(9–7)}, 7–5	(France) Gary Lugassy (France) Ludovic Walter	(Japan) Junn Mitsuhashi (South Korea) Jun Woong-sun	(South Korea) Kim Hyun-joon (Australia) Adam Feeney (France) Ludovic Walter (South Korea) Jeong Suk-young
April 5	USA F9 Futures; Little Rock, United States; Hard $15,000	(Australia) Brydan Klein; 6–3, 3–6, 6–3	(Australia) John Millman	(United States) Lester Cook (United States) Alexander Domijan	(United States) Blake Strode (Sweden) Michael Ryderstedt (Portugal) Leonardo Tavares (Australia) Kaden Hensel
April 5	USA F9 Futures; Little Rock, United States; Hard $15,000	(United States) Lester Cook (United States) Brett Joelson; 6–4, 3–6, [10–7]	(Australia) Brydan Klein (Australia) John Millman	(United States) Lester Cook (United States) Alexander Domijan	(United States) Blake Strode (Sweden) Michael Ryderstedt (Portugal) Leonardo Tavares (Australia) Kaden Hensel
April 5	Brazil F1 Futures; Santa Maria, Brazil; Clay $10,000	(Uruguay) Marcel Felder; 7–6^{(7–4)}, 6–4	(Brazil) Rafael Camilo	(Brazil) Daniel Dutra da Silva (Chile) Rodrigo Pérez	(Brazil) José Pereira (Brazil) Thales Turini (Argentina) Patricio Heras (Argentina) Alejandro Kon
April 5	Brazil F1 Futures; Santa Maria, Brazil; Clay $10,000	(Brazil) Gustavo Junqueira de Andrade (Brazil) Thales Turini; 6–2, 6–1	(Brazil) Rafael Camilo (Brazil) Fabrício Neis	(Brazil) Daniel Dutra da Silva (Chile) Rodrigo Pérez	(Brazil) José Pereira (Brazil) Thales Turini (Argentina) Patricio Heras (Argentina) Alejandro Kon
April 5	Japan F4 Futures; Tsukuba, Japan; Hard $10,000	(Japan) Yasutaka Uchiyama; 7–5, 6–1	(Japan) Shuichi Sekiguchi	(Japan) Yuichi Ito (Japan) Arata Onozawa	(Thailand) Peerakit Siributwong (Japan) Tasuku Iwami (Japan) Bumpei Sato (Japan) Yugo Inoue
April 5	Japan F4 Futures; Tsukuba, Japan; Hard $10,000	(Japan) Tasuku Iwami (Japan) Hiroki Moriya; 6–4, 6–2	(Japan) Bumpei Sato (United States) Maciek Sykut	(Japan) Yuichi Ito (Japan) Arata Onozawa	(Thailand) Peerakit Siributwong (Japan) Tasuku Iwami (Japan) Bumpei Sato (Japan) Yugo Inoue
April 5	Spain F11 Futures; Madrid, Spain; Hard $10,000	(Spain) Pablo Carreño Busta; 7–5, 6–7^{(5–7)}, 6–3	(Latvia) Kārlis Lejnieks	(Australia) Matt Reid (Lithuania) Laurynas Grigelis	(Portugal) Gastão Elias (France) Jérémy Blandin (Spain) Agustín Bojé-Ordóñez (Spain) Emilio Rodríguez-Navarro
April 5	Spain F11 Futures; Madrid, Spain; Hard $10,000	(France) Charles Antoine-Brézac (France) Vincent Stouff; 6–4, 6–2	(Spain) Pablo Carreño Busta (Spain) Javier Martí	(Australia) Matt Reid (Lithuania) Laurynas Grigelis	(Portugal) Gastão Elias (France) Jérémy Blandin (Spain) Agustín Bojé-Ordóñez (Spain) Emilio Rodríguez-Navarro
April 5	Turkey F6 Futures; Antalya, Turkey; Clay $10,000	(Austria) Marco Mirnegg; 6–3, 6–2	(Bosnia and Herzegovina) Aldin Šetkić	(Slovakia) Pavol Červenák (Chile) Hans Podlipnik Castillo	(Poland) Marcin Gawron (France) Laurent Rochette (Romania) Victor Ioniță (Austria) Nicolas Reissig
April 5	Turkey F6 Futures; Antalya, Turkey; Clay $10,000	(Chile) Hans Podlipnik Castillo (Chile) Ricardo Urzúa-Rivera; 6–4, 4–6, [14–12]	(Slovakia) Pavol Červenák (Czech Republic) Ladislav Chramosta	(Slovakia) Pavol Červenák (Chile) Hans Podlipnik Castillo	(Poland) Marcin Gawron (France) Laurent Rochette (Romania) Victor Ioniță (Austria) Nicolas Reissig
April 12	China F4 Futures; Guiyang, China; Hard $15,000	(China) Li Zhe; 6–4, 6–3	(China) Gong Maoxin	(France) Fabrice Martin (United Kingdom) Sean Thornley	(China) Wu Di (China) Chang Yu (Chinese Taipei) Lee Hsin-han (Croatia) Marin Franjičević
April 12	China F4 Futures; Guiyang, China; Hard $15,000	(China) Gong Maoxin (China) Li Zhe; 5–7, 6–3, [10–4]	(Chinese Taipei) Chang Yao-lun (South Korea) Daniel Yoo	(France) Fabrice Martin (United Kingdom) Sean Thornley	(China) Wu Di (China) Chang Yu (Chinese Taipei) Lee Hsin-han (Croatia) Marin Franjičević
April 12	France F6 Futures; Angers, France; Clay (indoor) $15,000+H	(France) Olivier Patience; 6–2, 6–4	(France) Sébastien de Chaunac	(France) Romain Jouan (Romania) Marius Copil	(France) Gleb Sakharov (France) Florian Reynet (France) Charles-Antoine Brézac (France) Clément Reix
April 12	France F6 Futures; Angers, France; Clay (indoor) $15,000+H	(France) Charles-Antoine Brézac (France) Vincent Stouff; 6–4, 6–1	(France) Olivier Charroin (Republic of Ireland) James McGee	(France) Romain Jouan (Romania) Marius Copil	(France) Gleb Sakharov (France) Florian Reynet (France) Charles-Antoine Brézac (France) Clément Reix
April 12	Italy F4 Futures; Vercelli, Italy; Clay $15,000+H	(Netherlands) Thomas Schoorel; 6–4, 6–3	(Austria) Martin Fischer	(Italy) Stefano Galvani (Russia) Ilya Belyaev	(Germany) Holger Fischer (Argentina) Jonathan Gonzalia (Spain) Sergio Gutiérrez Ferrol (Italy) Thomas Fabbiano
April 12	Italy F4 Futures; Vercelli, Italy; Clay $15,000+H	(Russia) Ilya Belyaev (Russia) Andrey Kuznetsov; 6–4, 7–6^{(7–2)}	(Argentina) Juan-Martín Aranguren (Argentina) Alejandro Fabbri	(Italy) Stefano Galvani (Russia) Ilya Belyaev	(Germany) Holger Fischer (Argentina) Jonathan Gonzalia (Spain) Sergio Gutiérrez Ferrol (Italy) Thomas Fabbiano
April 12	Korea F2 Futures; Daegu, South Korea; Hard $15,000	(Canada) Milos Raonic; 6–1, 6–1	(Japan) Hiroki Kondo	(Chinese Taipei) Yi Chu-huan (Slovakia) Marek Semjan	(Finland) Harri Heliövaara (France) Ludovic Walter (South Korea) Lim Yong-kyu (South Korea) Jun Woong-sun
April 12	Korea F2 Futures; Daegu, South Korea; Hard $15,000	(Australia) Adam Feeney (Finland) Harri Heliövaara; 6–2, 6–2	(Japan) Hiroki Kondo (Chinese Taipei) Yi Chu-huan	(Chinese Taipei) Yi Chu-huan (Slovakia) Marek Semjan	(Finland) Harri Heliövaara (France) Ludovic Walter (South Korea) Lim Yong-kyu (South Korea) Jun Woong-sun
April 12	Brazil F2 Futures; Bauru, Brazil; Clay $10,000	(Brazil) José Pereira; 6–4, 6–3	(Argentina) Alejandro Kon	(Brazil) Fabrício Neis (Argentina) Nicolás Pastor	(Argentina) Martín Ríos-Benítez (Chile) Rodrigo Pérez (Argentina) Gastón-Arturo Grimolizzi (Argentina) Juan-Manuel Valverde
April 12	Brazil F2 Futures; Bauru, Brazil; Clay $10,000	(Venezuela) Miguel Cicenia (Argentina) Maximiliano Estévez; 7–6^{(7–3)}, 2–6, [10–6]	(Mexico) Luis Díaz Barriga (Mexico) Miguel Ángel Reyes-Varela	(Brazil) Fabrício Neis (Argentina) Nicolás Pastor	(Argentina) Martín Ríos-Benítez (Chile) Rodrigo Pérez (Argentina) Gastón-Arturo Grimolizzi (Argentina) Juan-Manuel Valverde
April 12	Spain F12 Futures; Madrid, Spain; Clay $10,000	(Venezuela) David Souto; 6–4, 7–6^{(7–4)}	(Latvia) Kārlis Lejnieks	(Italy) Walter Trusendi (Spain) Pablo Martín-Adalia	(Spain) Javier Martí (United Kingdom) Morgan Phillips (United Kingdom) Marcus Willis (Bosnia and Herzegovina) Ismar Gorčić
April 12	Spain F12 Futures; Madrid, Spain; Clay $10,000	(Spain) Óscar Burrieza (Spain) Javier Martí; 6–4, 7–5	(Russia) Aleksandr Lobkov (Spain) Georgi Rumenov Payakov	(Italy) Walter Trusendi (Spain) Pablo Martín-Adalia	(Spain) Javier Martí (United Kingdom) Morgan Phillips (United Kingdom) Marcus Willis (Bosnia and Herzegovina) Ismar Gorčić
April 12	Turkey F7 Futures; Adana, Turkey; Clay $10,000	(Estonia) Jürgen Zopp; 6–2, 4–6, 6–4	(France) Augustin Gensse	(Germany) Marcel Zimmermann (Bosnia and Herzegovina) Aldin Šetkić	(Czech Republic) Michal Schmid (United Kingdom) Alexander Slabinsky (Slovenia) Aljaž Bedene (Austria) Nicolas Reissig
April 12	Turkey F7 Futures; Adana, Turkey; Clay $10,000	(Germany) Kevin Krawietz (Germany) Marcel Zimmermann; 6–4, 5–7, [10–6]	(Chile) Hans Podlipnik Castillo (Chile) Ricardo Urzúa-Rivera	(Germany) Marcel Zimmermann (Bosnia and Herzegovina) Aldin Šetkić	(Czech Republic) Michal Schmid (United Kingdom) Alexander Slabinsky (Slovenia) Aljaž Bedene (Austria) Nicolas Reissig
April 19	France F7 Futures; Grasse, France; Clay $15,000	(France) Olivier Patience; 6–3, 6–4	(France) Romain Jouan	(France) Kenny de Schepper (France) Grégoire Burquier	(Russia) Andrey Kuznetsov (Russia) Ilya Belyaev (Monaco) Benjamin Balleret (Chile) Cristóbal Saavedra Corvalán
April 19	France F7 Futures; Grasse, France; Clay $15,000	(France) Olivier Charroin (France) Vincent Stouff; 4–6, 6–2, [10–3]	(Russia) Ilya Belyaev (Russia) Evgeny Donskoy	(France) Kenny de Schepper (France) Grégoire Burquier	(Russia) Andrey Kuznetsov (Russia) Ilya Belyaev (Monaco) Benjamin Balleret (Chile) Cristóbal Saavedra Corvalán
April 19	Italy F5 Futures; Padova, Italy; Clay $15,000	(Germany) Cedrik-Marcel Stebe; 4–6, 6–1, 6–2	(Italy) Daniele Giorgini	(Slovenia) Blaž Rola (Egypt) Sherif Sabry	(Chinese Taipei) Yang Tsung-hua (Argentina) Leandro Migani (Serbia) Dušan Lajović (Denmark) Frederik Nielsen
April 19	Italy F5 Futures; Padova, Italy; Clay $15,000	(Denmark) Frederik Nielsen (Italy) Federico Torresi; 7–5, 4–6, [10–4]	(Egypt) Karim Maamoun (Egypt) Sherif Sabry	(Slovenia) Blaž Rola (Egypt) Sherif Sabry	(Chinese Taipei) Yang Tsung-hua (Argentina) Leandro Migani (Serbia) Dušan Lajović (Denmark) Frederik Nielsen
April 19	Korea F3 Futures; Changwon, South Korea; Hard $15,000	(United States) Jordan Cox; 6–4, 6–3	(China) Zhang Ze	(China) Gong Maoxin (China) Li Zhe	(Finland) Harri Heliövaara (Canada) Milos Raonic (South Korea) Jun Woong-sun (South Korea) Kwon Oh-hee
April 19	Korea F3 Futures; Changwon, South Korea; Hard $15,000	(Austria) Nikolaus Moser (Austria) Max Raditschnigg; 6–2, 2–6, [10–5]	(China) Gong Maoxin (China) Li Zhe	(China) Gong Maoxin (China) Li Zhe	(Finland) Harri Heliövaara (Canada) Milos Raonic (South Korea) Jun Woong-sun (South Korea) Kwon Oh-hee
April 19	Uzbekistan F1 Futures; Andijan, Uzbekistan; Hard $15,000	(Russia) Mikhail Elgin; 6–4, 6–4	(Switzerland) Adrien Bossel	(India) Vishnu Vardhan (Czech Republic) Roman Vögeli	(Czech Republic) Michal Konečný (Russia) Sergei Krotiouk (Russia) Anton Manegin (Russia) Ilia Starkov
April 19	Uzbekistan F1 Futures; Andijan, Uzbekistan; Hard $15,000	(Russia) Alexander Kudryavtsev (Ukraine) Denys Molchanov; 6–2, 6–1	(Russia) Mikhail Elgin (Kazakhstan) Alexey Kedryuk	(India) Vishnu Vardhan (Czech Republic) Roman Vögeli	(Czech Republic) Michal Konečný (Russia) Sergei Krotiouk (Russia) Anton Manegin (Russia) Ilia Starkov
April 19	Brazil F3 Futures; Brasília, Brazil; Clay $10,000	(France) Jonathan Eysseric; 4–6, 6–3, 6–3	(Italy) Daniel Alejandro López	(Chile) Javier Muñoz (Argentina) Maximiliano Estévez	(Brazil) José Pereira (Venezuela) Miguel Cicenia (Argentina) Alejandro Kon (Belgium) Yannick Vandenbulcke
April 19	Brazil F3 Futures; Brasília, Brazil; Clay $10,000	(Brazil) Victor Maynard (Brazil) Nicolas Santos; 6–4, 6–4	(France) Jonathan Eysseric (Italy) Daniel Alejandro López	(Chile) Javier Muñoz (Argentina) Maximiliano Estévez	(Brazil) José Pereira (Venezuela) Miguel Cicenia (Argentina) Alejandro Kon (Belgium) Yannick Vandenbulcke
April 19	Spain F13 Futures; Reus, Spain; Clay $10,000	(France) Laurent Rochette; 6–1, 6–1	(Spain) Andoni Vivanco-Guzmán	(Spain) Georgi Rumenov Payakov (Spain) Marc Fornell	(Russia) Aleksandr Lobkov (Slovakia) Kamil Čapkovič (France) Alexandre Renard (Spain) Pablo Santos
April 19	Spain F13 Futures; Reus, Spain; Clay $10,000	(Spain) Agustín Bojé-Ordoñez (Spain) Pablo Martín-Adalia; 7–6^{(7–4)}, 6–3	(Spain) Jordi Marse-Vidri (Spain) Pablo Santos	(Spain) Georgi Rumenov Payakov (Spain) Marc Fornell	(Russia) Aleksandr Lobkov (Slovakia) Kamil Čapkovič (France) Alexandre Renard (Spain) Pablo Santos
April 19	Turkey F8 Futures; Tarsus, Turkey; Clay $10,000	(Estonia) Jürgen Zopp; 6–3, 6–1	(Belgium) Alexandre Folie	(France) Augustin Gensse (Serbia) Nikola Ćaćić	(France) François-Arthur Vibert (Chile) Hans Podlipnik Castillo (Poland) Grzegorz Panfil (Czech Republic) Michal Schmid
April 19	Turkey F8 Futures; Tarsus, Turkey; Clay $10,000	(Germany) Kevin Krawietz (Germany) Marcel Zimmermann; 6–3, 6–7^{(5–7)}, [10–6]	(Chile) Hans Podlipnik Castillo (Chile) Ricardo Urzúa-Rivera	(France) Augustin Gensse (Serbia) Nikola Ćaćić	(France) François-Arthur Vibert (Chile) Hans Podlipnik Castillo (Poland) Grzegorz Panfil (Czech Republic) Michal Schmid
April 26	Australia F3 Futures; Ipswich, Australia; Clay $15,000	(Australia) Brydan Klein; 6–3, 6–4	(Australia) Jason Kubler	(Australia) Benjamin Mitchell (Australia) Brendan Moore	(Australia) Joel Lindner (Australia) Dane Propoggia (Australia) Andrew Gregory (Japan) Yuki Matsuo
April 26	Australia F3 Futures; Ipswich, Australia; Clay $15,000	(Australia) Brydan Klein (Australia) Dane Propoggia; 6–2, 6–3	(New Zealand) Marcus Daniell (New Zealand) Logan Mackenzie	(Australia) Benjamin Mitchell (Australia) Brendan Moore	(Australia) Joel Lindner (Australia) Dane Propoggia (Australia) Andrew Gregory (Japan) Yuki Matsuo
April 26	Italy F6 Futures; Vicenza, Italy; Clay $15,000	(Russia) Ilya Belyaev; 6–3, 6–2	(Argentina) Juan-Martín Aranguren	(Italy) Andrea Stoppini (Serbia) Dušan Lajović	(Netherlands) Thomas Schoorel (Germany) Cedrik-Marcel Stebe (France) Gianni Mina (Russia) Evgeny Donskoy
April 26	Italy F6 Futures; Vicenza, Italy; Clay $15,000	(Italy) Nicola Remedi (Italy) Andrea Stoppini; 6–2, 6–4	(Denmark) Frederik Nielsen (United Kingdom) Daniel Smethurst	(Italy) Andrea Stoppini (Serbia) Dušan Lajović	(Netherlands) Thomas Schoorel (Germany) Cedrik-Marcel Stebe (France) Gianni Mina (Russia) Evgeny Donskoy
April 26	Korea F4 Futures; Gimcheon, South Korea; Hard $15,000	(Canada) Milos Raonic; 6–4, 6–4	(Austria) Max Raditschnigg	(Australia) Adam Feeney (Chinese Taipei) Yi Chu-huan	(South Korea) Lim Yong-kyu (South Korea) An Jae-sung (Israel) Gilad Ben Zvi (South Korea) Jeong Suk-young
April 26	Korea F4 Futures; Gimcheon, South Korea; Hard $15,000	(South Korea) An Jae-sung (South Korea) Lim Yong-kyu; 7–6^{(7–4)}, 6–4	(Japan) Junn Mitsuhashi (Chinese Taipei) Yi Chu-huan	(Australia) Adam Feeney (Chinese Taipei) Yi Chu-huan	(South Korea) Lim Yong-kyu (South Korea) An Jae-sung (Israel) Gilad Ben Zvi (South Korea) Jeong Suk-young
April 26	Mexico F2 Futures; Córdoba, Mexico; Hard $15,000	(Mexico) Santiago González; 6–7^{(1–7)}, 6–2, 6–2	(Mexico) Bruno Rodríguez	(Slovakia) Ivo Klec (Colombia) Michael Quintero	(Australia) Nima Hoshan (United States) Ashwin Kumar (Mexico) César Ramírez (Canada) Vasek Pospisil
April 26	Mexico F2 Futures; Córdoba, Mexico; Hard $15,000	(Mexico) Santiago González (Mexico) Carlos Palencia; 5–7, 7–6^{(7–4)}, [10–8]	(Mexico) Miguel Gallardo Valles (Mexico) Pablo Martínez	(Slovakia) Ivo Klec (Colombia) Michael Quintero	(Australia) Nima Hoshan (United States) Ashwin Kumar (Mexico) César Ramírez (Canada) Vasek Pospisil
April 26	Uzbekistan F2 Futures; Namangan, Uzbekistan; Hard $15,000	(Russia) Alexander Kudryavtsev; 6–4, 6–4	(Ukraine) Denys Molchanov	(Russia) Mikhail Elgin (Belarus) Andrei Vasilevski	(India) Vishnu Vardhan (Kazakhstan) Alexey Kedryuk (Russia) Artem Sitak (India) Rohan Gajjar
April 26	Uzbekistan F2 Futures; Namangan, Uzbekistan; Hard $15,000	(Russia) Mikhail Elgin (Kazakhstan) Alexey Kedryuk; 6–4, 7–6^{(7–3)}	(India) Rohan Gajjar (India) Karan Rastogi	(Russia) Mikhail Elgin (Belarus) Andrei Vasilevski	(India) Vishnu Vardhan (Kazakhstan) Alexey Kedryuk (Russia) Artem Sitak (India) Rohan Gajjar
April 26	Argentina F4 Futures; Buenos Aires, Argentina; Clay $10,000	(Argentina) Lionel Noviski; 6–4, 6–4	(Argentina) Guillermo Durán	(Argentina) Guillermo Bujniewicz (Argentina) Andrés Molteni	(Argentina) Juan-Manuel Valverde (Argentina) Nicolás Jara-Lozano (Argentina) Pablo Galdón (Argentina) Facundo Argüello
April 26	Argentina F4 Futures; Buenos Aires, Argentina; Clay $10,000	(Argentina) Facundo Argüello (Argentina) Agustín Velotti; 6–1, 6–1	(Argentina) Gastón-Arturo Grimolizzi (Chile) Rodrigo Pérez	(Argentina) Guillermo Bujniewicz (Argentina) Andrés Molteni	(Argentina) Juan-Manuel Valverde (Argentina) Nicolás Jara-Lozano (Argentina) Pablo Galdón (Argentina) Facundo Argüello
April 26	Brazil F4 Futures; Fortaleza, Brazil; Clay $10,000	(Uruguay) Marcel Felder; 4–6, 6–3, 6–4	(Brazil) Eládio Ribeiro Neto	(Brazil) Fernando Romboli (Brazil) Tiago Fernandes	(Brazil) Alexandre Bonatto (Colombia) Sebastián Serrano (Brazil) Ricardo Siggia (Brazil) José Pereira
April 26	Brazil F4 Futures; Fortaleza, Brazil; Clay $10,000	(Mexico) Luis Díaz Barriga (Mexico) Miguel Ángel Reyes-Varela; 6–7^{(5–7)}, 7–6^{(7–2)}, [10–6]	(Brazil) Franco Ferreiro (Brazil) Fernando Romboli	(Brazil) Fernando Romboli (Brazil) Tiago Fernandes	(Brazil) Alexandre Bonatto (Colombia) Sebastián Serrano (Brazil) Ricardo Siggia (Brazil) José Pereira
April 26	Great Britain F5 Futures (United Kingdom) Bournemouth, Great Britain; Clay $10,000	(France) Éric Prodon; 7–6^{(7–3)}, 6–1	(Russia) Mikhail Vasiliev	(Slovakia) Kamil Čapkovič (Australia) Colin Ebelthite	(Italy) Matteo Marrai (United Kingdom) Marcus Willis (France) Gleb Sakharov (United Kingdom) Alexander Slabinsky
April 26	Great Britain F5 Futures (United Kingdom) Bournemouth, Great Britain; Clay $10,000	(Italy) Claudio Grassi (Italy) Matteo Marrai; 6–3, 6–3	(Australia) Colin Ebelthite (Australia) Jarryd Maher	(Slovakia) Kamil Čapkovič (Australia) Colin Ebelthite	(Italy) Matteo Marrai (United Kingdom) Marcus Willis (France) Gleb Sakharov (United Kingdom) Alexander Slabinsky
April 26	Spain F14 Futures; Vic, Spain; Clay $10,000	(Spain) Sergio Gutiérrez Ferrol; 2–6, 7–5, 7–5	(France) Benoît Paire	(Spain) Pablo Carreño Busta (Spain) Pablo Santos	(Spain) Gerard Granollers (Spain) Marcelo Palacios-Siegenthale (Italy) Francesco Piccari (France) Romain Jouan
April 26	Spain F14 Futures; Vic, Spain; Clay $10,000	(Spain) David Cañudas-Fernández (Spain) Pablo Martín-Adalia; 6–4, 6–2	(Spain) Marc Fornell (France) Olivier Lemaître	(Spain) Pablo Carreño Busta (Spain) Pablo Santos	(Spain) Gerard Granollers (Spain) Marcelo Palacios-Siegenthale (Italy) Francesco Piccari (France) Romain Jouan
April 26	USA F10 Futures; Vero Beach, United States; Clay $10,000	(Latvia) Kārlis Lejnieks; 6–4, 6–4	(Australia) Matt Reid	(United States) Alexander Domijan (United States) Denis Kudla	(Germany) Alexander Satschko (Colombia) Nicolás Barrientos (Norway) Erling Tveit (Germany) Gero Kretschmer
April 26	USA F10 Futures; Vero Beach, United States; Clay $10,000	(Germany) Gero Kretschmer (Germany) Alexander Satschko; 7–6^{(7–3)}, 6–3	(United States) Bryan Koniecko (United States) Maciek Sykut	(United States) Alexander Domijan (United States) Denis Kudla	(Germany) Alexander Satschko (Colombia) Nicolás Barrientos (Norway) Erling Tveit (Germany) Gero Kretschmer

== May ==
Week of	Tournament	Winner	Runners-up	Semifinalists	Quarterfinalists
May 3	Australia F4 Futures; Bundaberg, Australia; Clay $15,000	(Australia) Brydan Klein; 7–5, 6–3	(Australia) Dane Propoggia	(United Kingdom) Myles Blake (New Zealand) Marcus Daniell	(Australia) Joel Lindner (New Zealand) Marvin Barker (Australia) James Duckworth (Japan) Arata Onozawa
May 3	Australia F4 Futures; Bundaberg, Australia; Clay $15,000	(Australia) Brydan Klein (Australia) Dane Propoggia; 6–1, 6–0	(Australia) Michael Look (New Zealand) Logan Mackenzie	(United Kingdom) Myles Blake (New Zealand) Marcus Daniell	(Australia) Joel Lindner (New Zealand) Marvin Barker (Australia) James Duckworth (Japan) Arata Onozawa
May 3	India F4 Futures; Kolkata, India; Hard $15,000	(Uzbekistan) Murad Inoyatov; 6–4, 6–4	(India) Karan Rastogi	(India) Yuki Bhambri (Thailand) Weerapat Doakmaiklee	(China) Yu Xin-yuan (Thailand) Kittiphong Wachiramanowong (India) Rohan Gajjar (Thailand) Perakiat Siriluethaiwattana
May 3	India F4 Futures; Kolkata, India; Hard $15,000	(India) Vivek Shokeen (India) Ashutosh Singh; 6–4, 7–6^{(7–3)}	(Uzbekistan) Murad Inoyatov (India) Yannick Nelord	(India) Yuki Bhambri (Thailand) Weerapat Doakmaiklee	(China) Yu Xin-yuan (Thailand) Kittiphong Wachiramanowong (India) Rohan Gajjar (Thailand) Perakiat Siriluethaiwattana
May 3	Argentina F5 Futures; Buenos Aires, Argentina; Clay $10,000	(Argentina) Facundo Argüello; 6–2, 6–1	(Argentina) Patricio Heras	(Argentina) Guillermo Durán (Argentina) Diego Sebastián Schwartzman	(Argentina) Renzo Olivo (Peru) Mauricio Echazú (Argentina) Pablo Galdón (Uruguay) Federico Sansonetti
May 3	Argentina F5 Futures; Buenos Aires, Argentina; Clay $10,000	(Argentina) Renzo Olivo (Argentina) Diego Sebastián Schwartzman; 2–6, 6–2, [10–8]	(Argentina) Facundo Argüello (Argentina) Agustín Velotti	(Argentina) Guillermo Durán (Argentina) Diego Sebastián Schwartzman	(Argentina) Renzo Olivo (Peru) Mauricio Echazú (Argentina) Pablo Galdón (Uruguay) Federico Sansonetti
May 3	B&H F3 Futures (Bosnia and Herzegovina) Doboj, Bosnia & Herzegovina; Clay $10,000	(Czech Republic) Michal Schmid; 5–7, 6–2, 7–6^{(7–4)}	(Slovenia) Aljaž Bedene	(Hungary) Ádám Kellner (Croatia) Ante Pavić	(Slovenia) Blaž Rola (Croatia) Krešimir Ritz (Bosnia and Herzegovina) Mirza Bašić (Bosnia and Herzegovina) Aldin Šetkić
May 3	B&H F3 Futures (Bosnia and Herzegovina) Doboj, Bosnia & Herzegovina; Clay $10,000	(Austria) Michael Linzer (Austria) Herbert Wiltschnig; Walkover	(Slovenia) Martin Rmuš (Slovenia) Blaž Rola	(Hungary) Ádám Kellner (Croatia) Ante Pavić	(Slovenia) Blaž Rola (Croatia) Krešimir Ritz (Bosnia and Herzegovina) Mirza Bašić (Bosnia and Herzegovina) Aldin Šetkić
May 3	Brazil F5 Futures; Teresina, Brazil; Clay $10,000	(Brazil) Franco Ferreiro; 7–5, 6–3	(Brazil) Thales Turini	(Mexico) Luis Díaz Barriga (Brazil) Daniel Dutra da Silva	(Brazil) Alexandre Bonatto (Brazil) Andrew Lauret (Brazil) André Miele (Brazil) Fabrício Neis
May 3	Brazil F5 Futures; Teresina, Brazil; Clay $10,000	(Mexico) Luis Díaz Barriga (Mexico) Miguel Ángel Reyes-Varela; 6–4, 3–6, [10–7]	(Brazil) Alexandre Bonatto (Brazil) José Pereira	(Mexico) Luis Díaz Barriga (Brazil) Daniel Dutra da Silva	(Brazil) Alexandre Bonatto (Brazil) Andrew Lauret (Brazil) André Miele (Brazil) Fabrício Neis
May 3	Bulgaria F1 Futures; Varna, Bulgaria; Clay $10,000	(Romania) Adrian Cruciat; 6–4, 3–6, 6–2	(Belgium) Alexandre Folie	(Sweden) Carl Bergman (Russia) Mikhail Vasiliev	(Romania) Andrei Mlendea (Romania) Robert Coman (Belarus) Vladzimir Kruk (Romania) Florin Mergea
May 3	Bulgaria F1 Futures; Varna, Bulgaria; Clay $10,000	(Spain) Óscar Burrieza (Spain) Javier Martí; 6–4, 4–6, [10–6]	(Ukraine) Gleb Alekseenko (Ukraine) Vadim Alekseenko	(Sweden) Carl Bergman (Russia) Mikhail Vasiliev	(Romania) Andrei Mlendea (Romania) Robert Coman (Belarus) Vladzimir Kruk (Romania) Florin Mergea
May 3	Czech Republic F1 Futures; Teplice, Czech Republic; Clay $10,000	(Estonia) Jürgen Zopp; 4–6, 6–2, 7–5	(Germany) Alexander Flock	(Czech Republic) Robert Rumler (Germany) Dennis Blömke	(Australia) James Lemke (Russia) Andrey Kumantsov (Hungary) György Balázs (Germany) Marc Sieber
May 3	Czech Republic F1 Futures; Teplice, Czech Republic; Clay $10,000	(Czech Republic) Jan Mertl (Poland) Grzegorz Panfil; 6–3, 6–4	(Chile) Ricardo Urzúa-Rivera (Estonia) Jürgen Zopp	(Czech Republic) Robert Rumler (Germany) Dennis Blömke	(Australia) James Lemke (Russia) Andrey Kumantsov (Hungary) György Balázs (Germany) Marc Sieber
May 3	Great Britain F6 Futures (United Kingdom) Edinburgh, Great Britain; Clay $10,000	(United Kingdom) Alexander Slabinsky; 7–6^{(7–4)}, 7–5	(France) Mathieu Rodrigues	(Italy) Claudio Grassi (France) Jonathan Eysseric	(United Kingdom) Alexander Ward (United Kingdom) Daniel Cox (Republic of Ireland) Barry King (Switzerland) Alexander Sadecky
May 3	Great Britain F6 Futures (United Kingdom) Edinburgh, Great Britain; Clay $10,000	(Republic of Ireland) James Cluskey (Republic of Ireland) Colin O'Brien; 6–3, 6–3	(Republic of Ireland) Barry King (United Kingdom) Marcus Willis	(Italy) Claudio Grassi (France) Jonathan Eysseric	(United Kingdom) Alexander Ward (United Kingdom) Daniel Cox (Republic of Ireland) Barry King (Switzerland) Alexander Sadecky
May 3	Italy F7 Futures; Viterbo, Italy; Clay $10,000	(Chile) Guillermo Hormazábal; 5–7, 6–3, 6–4	(United Kingdom) Daniel Evans	(Italy) Luca Vanni (Italy) Walter Trusendi	(Lithuania) Laurynas Grigelis (Bosnia and Herzegovina) Ismar Gorčić (Argentina) Diego Álvarez (Italy) Enrico Iannuzzi
May 3	Italy F7 Futures; Viterbo, Italy; Clay $10,000	(Chile) Guillermo Hormazábal (Italy) Walter Trusendi; 6–2, 6–1	(Italy) Enrico Fioravante (Italy) Giancarlo Petrazzuolo	(Italy) Luca Vanni (Italy) Walter Trusendi	(Lithuania) Laurynas Grigelis (Bosnia and Herzegovina) Ismar Gorčić (Argentina) Diego Álvarez (Italy) Enrico Iannuzzi
May 3	Mexico F3 Futures; Mexico City, Mexico; Hard $10,000	(Mexico) Miguel Gallardo Valles; 6–3, 6–4	(Mexico) Víctor Romero	(Australia) Mark Verryth (Australia) Nima Roshan	(Guatemala) Christopher Díaz Figueroa (United States) Connor Pollock (Russia) Danila Arsenov (Mexico) César Ramírez
May 3	Mexico F3 Futures; Mexico City, Mexico; Hard $10,000	(Mexico) César Ramírez (Australia) Nima Roshan; 6–3, 3–6, [14–12]	(United States) Brett Joelson (United States) Connor Pollock	(Australia) Mark Verryth (Australia) Nima Roshan	(Guatemala) Christopher Díaz Figueroa (United States) Connor Pollock (Russia) Danila Arsenov (Mexico) César Ramírez
May 3	Spain F15 Futures; Balaguer, Spain; Clay $10,000	(Canada) Steven Diez; 6–2, 6–1	(Spain) David Estruch	(Russia) Aleksandr Lobkov (Venezuela) David Souto	(Spain) Miguel Ángel López Jaén (Spain) Juan Lizariturry (Spain) Jordi Vives (Italy) Massimo Capone
May 3	Spain F15 Futures; Balaguer, Spain; Clay $10,000	(Spain) Jordi Marse-Vidri (Spain) Pablo Martín-Adalia; 6–1, 5–7, [10–5]	(Sweden) Milos Sekulic (Germany) Richard Waite	(Russia) Aleksandr Lobkov (Venezuela) David Souto	(Spain) Miguel Ángel López Jaén (Spain) Juan Lizariturry (Spain) Jordi Vives (Italy) Massimo Capone
May 3	USA F11 Futures; Orange Park, United States; Clay $10,000	(Italy) Matteo Viola; 6–2, 6–1	(Italy) Stefano Ianni	(United States) Michael Venus (Canada) Philip Bester	(United States) Alexander Domijan (United States) Andrea Collarini (France) Augustin Gensse (Latvia) Kārlis Lejnieks
May 3	USA F11 Futures; Orange Park, United States; Clay $10,000	(United States) Andrea Collarini (United States) Denis Kudla; 7–6^{(8–6)}, 6–3	(United States) Mitchell Frank (United States) Junior Alexander Ore	(United States) Michael Venus (Canada) Philip Bester	(United States) Alexander Domijan (United States) Andrea Collarini (France) Augustin Gensse (Latvia) Kārlis Lejnieks
May 10	Brazil F6 Futures; Caldas Novas, Brazil; Hard $15,000	(Brazil) Marcelo Demoliner; 7–6^{(7–5)}, 6–4	(Brazil) Rodrigo Guidolin	(Brazil) Leonardo Kirche (Italy) Daniel Alejandro López	(Brazil) Carlos Oliveira (Brazil) André Miele (Ecuador) Iván Endara (Mexico) Miguel Ángel Reyes-Varela
May 10	Brazil F6 Futures; Caldas Novas, Brazil; Hard $15,000	(Brazil) Franco Ferreiro (Brazil) André Miele; 6–3, 6–4	(Mexico) Luis Díaz Barriga (Mexico) Miguel Ángel Reyes-Varela	(Brazil) Leonardo Kirche (Italy) Daniel Alejandro López	(Brazil) Carlos Oliveira (Brazil) André Miele (Ecuador) Iván Endara (Mexico) Miguel Ángel Reyes-Varela
May 10	India F5 Futures; New Delhi, India; Hard $15,000	(South Africa) Rik de Voest; 7–5, 6–2	(India) Karan Rastogi	(India) Ranjeet Virali-Murugesan (China) Chang Yu	(Uzbekistan) Murad Inoyatov (Thailand) Kittiphong Wachiramanowong (Chinese Taipei) Huang Liang-chi (India) Yuki Bhambri
May 10	India F5 Futures; New Delhi, India; Hard $15,000	(India) Ranjeet Virali-Murugesan (China) Yu Xin-yuan; 3–6, 6–1, [11–9]	(Thailand) Weerapat Doakmaiklee (Thailand) Kittiphong Wachiramanowong	(India) Ranjeet Virali-Murugesan (China) Chang Yu	(Uzbekistan) Murad Inoyatov (Thailand) Kittiphong Wachiramanowong (Chinese Taipei) Huang Liang-chi (India) Yuki Bhambri
May 10	Italy F8 Futures; Pozzuoli, Italy; Clay $15,000	(Italy) Alessio di Mauro; 7–5, 6–4	(Italy) Simone Vagnozzi	(Argentina) Diego Álvarez (United Kingdom) Daniel Evans	(Germany) Bastian Knittel (Romania) Marius Copil (Argentina) Jonathan Gonzalia (Argentina) Juan-Martín Aranguren
May 10	Italy F8 Futures; Pozzuoli, Italy; Clay $15,000	(Argentina) Juan-Martín Aranguren (Argentina) Alejandro Fabbri; 6–4, 7–6^{(7–4)}	(United Kingdom) Daniel Evans (Lithuania) Laurynas Grigelis	(Argentina) Diego Álvarez (United Kingdom) Daniel Evans	(Germany) Bastian Knittel (Romania) Marius Copil (Argentina) Jonathan Gonzalia (Argentina) Juan-Martín Aranguren
May 10	Argentina F6 Futures; Buenos Aires, Argentina; Clay $10,000	(Argentina) Andrés Molteni; 6–4, 6–3	(Argentina) Antonio Pastorino	(Argentina) Marco Trungelliti (Argentina) Lionel Noviski	(Argentina) Renzo Olivo (Argentina) Agustín Picco (Peru) Iván Miranda (Italy) Stefano Travaglia
May 10	Argentina F6 Futures; Buenos Aires, Argentina; Clay $10,000	(Argentina) Diego Cristin (Uruguay) Martín Cuevas; 6–2, 6–3	(Argentina) Andrés Molteni (Argentina) Agustín Picco	(Argentina) Marco Trungelliti (Argentina) Lionel Noviski	(Argentina) Renzo Olivo (Argentina) Agustín Picco (Peru) Iván Miranda (Italy) Stefano Travaglia
May 10	B&H F4 Futures (Bosnia and Herzegovina) Sarajevo, Bosnia & Herzegovina; Clay $10,000	(Czech Republic) Michal Schmid; Walkover	(France) Guillaume Rufin	(Austria) Herbert Wiltschnig (Croatia) Franko Škugor	(Serbia) Dušan Lajović (Serbia) Ivan Bjelica (Hungary) Ádám Kellner (Serbia) Arsenije Zlatanović
May 10	B&H F4 Futures (Bosnia and Herzegovina) Sarajevo, Bosnia & Herzegovina; Clay $10,000	(Serbia) Dušan Lajović (Serbia) Miljan Zekić; 6–3, 6–4	(Bosnia and Herzegovina) Mirza Bašić (Bosnia and Herzegovina) Zlatan Kadrić	(Austria) Herbert Wiltschnig (Croatia) Franko Škugor	(Serbia) Dušan Lajović (Serbia) Ivan Bjelica (Hungary) Ádám Kellner (Serbia) Arsenije Zlatanović
May 10	Bulgaria F2 Futures; Varna, Bulgaria; Clay $10,000	(Spain) Javier Martí; 6–2, 6–1	(Romania) Adrian Cruciat	(Italy) Andrea Falgheri (Bulgaria) Todor Enev	(Bulgaria) Ivaylo Traykov (Spain) Óscar Sabate-Bretos (Romania) Victor-Mugurel Anagnastopol (Moldova) Roman Tudoreanu
May 10	Bulgaria F2 Futures; Varna, Bulgaria; Clay $10,000	(Romania) Alexandru-Daniel Carpen (Romania) Adrian Cruciat; 6–4, 6–4	(Bulgaria) Tihomir Grozdanov (Bulgaria) Ivaylo Traykov	(Italy) Andrea Falgheri (Bulgaria) Todor Enev	(Bulgaria) Ivaylo Traykov (Spain) Óscar Sabate-Bretos (Romania) Victor-Mugurel Anagnastopol (Moldova) Roman Tudoreanu
May 10	Czech Republic F2 Futures; Most, Czech Republic; Clay $10,000	(Germany) Dennis Blömke; 7–6^{(7–2)}, 6–1	(Czech Republic) Robin Vik	(Germany) Marc Sieber (Slovakia) Miloslav Mečíř Jr.	(Slovakia) Kamil Čapkovič (Czech Republic) Jiří Veselý (Russia) Andrey Kumantsov (Australia) James Lemke
May 10	Czech Republic F2 Futures; Most, Czech Republic; Clay $10,000	(Czech Republic) Roman Jebavý (Russia) Andrey Kumantsov; 6–4, 6–2	(Slovakia) Kamil Čapkovič (Slovakia) Miloslav Mečíř Jr.	(Germany) Marc Sieber (Slovakia) Miloslav Mečíř Jr.	(Slovakia) Kamil Čapkovič (Czech Republic) Jiří Veselý (Russia) Andrey Kumantsov (Australia) James Lemke
May 10	Great Britain F7 Futures (United Kingdom) Newcastle, Great Britain; Clay $10,000	(France) Éric Prodon; 6–3, 3–6, 6–1	(France) Mathieu Rodrigues	(United Kingdom) Josh Goodall (Spain) Ignacio Coll Riudavets	(France) Ludovic Walter (France) Thomas Cazes-Carrère (United Kingdom) Matthew Illingworth (Spain) Gerard Granollers
May 10	Great Britain F7 Futures (United Kingdom) Newcastle, Great Britain; Clay $10,000	(Spain) Ignacio Coll Riudavets (Spain) Gerard Granollers; 6–1, 6–4	(United Kingdom) Maniel Bains (United Kingdom) Marcus Willis	(United Kingdom) Josh Goodall (Spain) Ignacio Coll Riudavets	(France) Ludovic Walter (France) Thomas Cazes-Carrère (United Kingdom) Matthew Illingworth (Spain) Gerard Granollers
May 10	Mexico F4 Futures; Celaya, Mexico; Hard $10,000	(Mexico) Víctor Romero; 4–6, 6–3, 6–2	(United States) Adam El Mihdawy	(United States) Christian Welte (Colombia) Michael Quintero	(Australia) Mark Verryth (Australia) Nima Roshan (Mexico) Mauricio Astorga (Mexico) César Ramírez
May 10	Mexico F4 Futures; Celaya, Mexico; Hard $10,000	(United States) Ashwin Kumar (United States) Connor Pollock; 6–4, 6–4	(Mexico) Miguel Gallardo Valles (Mexico) Pablo Martínez	(United States) Christian Welte (Colombia) Michael Quintero	(Australia) Mark Verryth (Australia) Nima Roshan (Mexico) Mauricio Astorga (Mexico) César Ramírez
May 10	Spain F16 Futures; Lleida, Spain; Clay $10,000	(Spain) Íñigo Cervantes Huegun; 6–4, 7–5	(Spain) Andoni Vivanco-Guzmán	(Spain) Pablo Martín-Adalia (Canada) Steven Diez	(Portugal) João Sousa (Spain) Miguel Ángel López Jaén (United Kingdom) Morgan Phillips (Spain) Emilio Rodríguez-Navarro
May 10	Spain F16 Futures; Lleida, Spain; Clay $10,000	(Spain) Miguel Ángel López Jaén (Australia) Allen Perel; 6–2, 6–0	(Germany) Matthias Dörfler (Spain) Santos Sánchez-Patino	(Spain) Pablo Martín-Adalia (Canada) Steven Diez	(Portugal) João Sousa (Spain) Miguel Ángel López Jaén (United Kingdom) Morgan Phillips (Spain) Emilio Rodríguez-Navarro
May 10	USA F12 Futures; Tampa, United States; Clay $10,000	(France) Augustin Gensse; 6–3, 6–2	(Norway) Erling Tveit	(Latvia) Kārlis Lejnieks (Italy) Stefano Ianni	(South Africa) Fritz Wolmarans (United States) Blake Strode (United States) Alexander Domijan (United States) Robbye Poole
May 10	USA F12 Futures; Tampa, United States; Clay $10,000	(United States) Denis Kudla (United States) Junior Alexander Ore; 4–6, 6–3, [10–8]	(Brazil) Clayton Almeida (United States) Blake Strode	(Latvia) Kārlis Lejnieks (Italy) Stefano Ianni	(South Africa) Fritz Wolmarans (United States) Blake Strode (United States) Alexander Domijan (United States) Robbye Poole
May 17	Italy F9 Futures; Parma, Italy; Clay $15,000	(Italy) Daniele Giorgini; 6–4, 5–7, 6–3	(Austria) Johannes Ager	(Italy) Alberto Brizzi (Spain) Pablo Santos	(Switzerland) Yann Marti (Slovenia) Janez Semrajc (Japan) Hiroki Moriya (Austria) Christian Magg
May 17	Italy F9 Futures; Parma, Italy; Clay $15,000	(Italy) Alberto Brizzi (Italy) Giuseppe Montenet; 6–2, 3–6, [10–3]	(Argentina) Alejandro Fabbri (Argentina) Leandro Migani	(Italy) Alberto Brizzi (Spain) Pablo Santos	(Switzerland) Yann Marti (Slovenia) Janez Semrajc (Japan) Hiroki Moriya (Austria) Christian Magg
May 17	Poland F1 Futures; Katowice, Poland; Clay $15,000	(Germany) Alexander Flock; 6–7^{(5–7)}, 6–4, 6–4	(Poland) Błażej Koniusz	(Poland) Dawid Olejniczak (Poland) Piotr Gadomski	(Poland) Jerzy Janowicz (Poland) Marcin Gawron (Austria) Oliver Marach (United Kingdom) Daniel Smethurst
May 17	Poland F1 Futures; Katowice, Poland; Clay $15,000	(Chile) Adrián García (Chile) Hans Podlipnik Castillo; 7–5, 7–5	(Russia) Denis Matsukevich (Chile) Cristóbal Saavedra Corvalán	(Poland) Dawid Olejniczak (Poland) Piotr Gadomski	(Poland) Jerzy Janowicz (Poland) Marcin Gawron (Austria) Oliver Marach (United Kingdom) Daniel Smethurst
May 17	South Africa F1 Futures; Durban, South Africa; Hard $15,000	(South Africa) Andrew Anderson; 3–6, 6–3, 7–6^{(7–3)}	(Israel) Amir Weintraub	(Greece) Theodoros Angelinos (Switzerland) Adrien Bossel	(United Kingdom) Joshua Milton (South Africa) Renier Moolman (Greece) Alexandros Jakupovic (South Africa) Raven Klaasen
May 17	South Africa F1 Futures; Durban, South Africa; Hard $15,000	(Austria) Nikolaus Moser (Austria) Max Raditschnigg; 7–5, 6–1	(Russia) Sergei Krotiouk (Russia) Vitali Reshetnikov	(Greece) Theodoros Angelinos (Switzerland) Adrien Bossel	(United Kingdom) Joshua Milton (South Africa) Renier Moolman (Greece) Alexandros Jakupovic (South Africa) Raven Klaasen
May 17	B&H F5 Futures (Bosnia and Herzegovina) Brčko, Bosnia & Herzegovina; Clay $10,000	(Montenegro) Goran Tošić; 7–5, 6–3	(Austria) Michael Linzer	(Serbia) David Savić (Serbia) Dejan Katić	(Serbia) Arsenije Zlatanović (Bosnia and Herzegovina) Mirza Bašić (Croatia) Antonio Šančić (Croatia) Ante Bilić
May 17	B&H F5 Futures (Bosnia and Herzegovina) Brčko, Bosnia & Herzegovina; Clay $10,000	(Serbia) Ivan Bjelica (Serbia) Miljan Zekić; 7–6^{(7–4)}, 7–5	(Serbia) David Savić (Montenegro) Goran Tošić	(Serbia) David Savić (Serbia) Dejan Katić	(Serbia) Arsenije Zlatanović (Bosnia and Herzegovina) Mirza Bašić (Croatia) Antonio Šančić (Croatia) Ante Bilić
May 17	Brazil F7 Futures; Marília, Brazil; Clay $10,000	(Brazil) Leonardo Kirche; 6–3, 6–4	(Brazil) Marcelo Demoliner	(Brazil) Daniel Dutra da Silva (Argentina) Cristhian Ignacio Benedetti	(Brazil) Andrew Lauret (Brazil) Rodrigo Guidolin (Brazil) Nicolas Santos (Brazil) Tiago Fernandes
May 17	Brazil F7 Futures; Marília, Brazil; Clay $10,000	(Brazil) Marcelo Demoliner (Brazil) Rodrigo Guidolin; 4–6, 6–1, [11–9]	(Mexico) Luis Díaz Barriga (Mexico) Miguel Ángel Reyes-Varela	(Brazil) Daniel Dutra da Silva (Argentina) Cristhian Ignacio Benedetti	(Brazil) Andrew Lauret (Brazil) Rodrigo Guidolin (Brazil) Nicolas Santos (Brazil) Tiago Fernandes
May 17	Bulgaria F3 Futures; Plovdiv, Bulgaria; Clay $10,000	(Bulgaria) Tihomir Grozdanov; 6–4, 6–3	(Spain) Javier Martí	(Spain) Óscar Sabate-Bretos (Sweden) Carl Bergman	(Estonia) Jürgen Zopp (Russia) Mikhail Vasiliev (Czech Republic) Michal Schmid (Bulgaria) Tzvetan Mihov
May 17	Bulgaria F3 Futures; Plovdiv, Bulgaria; Clay $10,000	(Bulgaria) Tihomir Grozdanov (Bulgaria) Ivaylo Traykov; 6–4, 6–3	(Ukraine) Ivan Anikanov (Moldova) Roman Tudoreanu	(Spain) Óscar Sabate-Bretos (Sweden) Carl Bergman	(Estonia) Jürgen Zopp (Russia) Mikhail Vasiliev (Czech Republic) Michal Schmid (Bulgaria) Tzvetan Mihov
May 17	Czech Republic F3 Futures; Jablonec nad Nisou, Czech Republic; Clay $10,000	(Czech Republic) Jaroslav Pospíšil; 7–5, 6–7^{(5–7)}, 6–4	(Czech Republic) Jan Mertl	(Germany) Jan-Lennard Struff (Czech Republic) Roman Jebavý	(Australia) James Lemke (Slovakia) Miloslav Mečíř Jr. (Hungary) Ádám Kellner (Czech Republic) Ladislav Chramosta
May 17	Czech Republic F3 Futures; Jablonec nad Nisou, Czech Republic; Clay $10,000	(Czech Republic) Jan Hradský (Czech Republic) Jan Šátral; 6–2, 6–3	(Slovakia) Miloslav Mečíř Jr. (Slovakia) Michal Pažický	(Germany) Jan-Lennard Struff (Czech Republic) Roman Jebavý	(Australia) James Lemke (Slovakia) Miloslav Mečíř Jr. (Hungary) Ádám Kellner (Czech Republic) Ladislav Chramosta
May 17	Romania F1 Futures; Bucharest, Romania; Clay $10,000	(France) Florian Reynet; 6–2, 3–6, 6–1	(Ukraine) Artem Smirnov	(Germany) Marcel Zimmermann (Italy) Francesco Piccari	(Romania) Robert Coman (Romania) Paul-Mihai Puscasu (Romania) Florin Mergea (Romania) Marcel-Ioan Miron
May 17	Romania F1 Futures; Bucharest, Romania; Clay $10,000	(Germany) Sascha Heinemann (Germany) Marcel Zimmermann; 6–2, 6–4	(Italy) Francesco Piccari (Ukraine) Artem Smirnov	(Germany) Marcel Zimmermann (Italy) Francesco Piccari	(Romania) Robert Coman (Romania) Paul-Mihai Puscasu (Romania) Florin Mergea (Romania) Marcel-Ioan Miron
May 17	Spain F17 Futures; Valldoreix, Spain; Clay $10,000	(Portugal) João Sousa; 6–0, 6–3	(Russia) Ivan Nedelko	(United Kingdom) Morgan Phillips (United States) Andrea Collarini	(Spain) Juan Lizariturry (Spain) Marc Fornell (Venezuela) David Souto (Spain) Gerard Granollers
May 17	Spain F17 Futures; Valldoreix, Spain; Clay $10,000	(Spain) David Cañudas-Fernández (Spain) Marc Fornell; 6–3, 7–6^{(7–2)}	(Spain) Gerard Granollers (Spain) Juan Lizariturry	(United Kingdom) Morgan Phillips (United States) Andrea Collarini	(Spain) Juan Lizariturry (Spain) Marc Fornell (Venezuela) David Souto (Spain) Gerard Granollers
May 24	Italy F10 Futures; Cesena, Italy; Clay $15,000	(Denmark) Frederik Nielsen; 7–5, 6–7^{(5–7)}, 3–3 retired	(Netherlands) Matwé Middelkoop	(Italy) Alessio di Mauro (Uruguay) Marcel Felder	(Spain) Gabriel Trujillo Soler (Argentina) Juan-Martín Aranguren (Austria) Philipp Oswald (Italy) Thomas Fabbiano
May 24	Italy F10 Futures; Cesena, Italy; Clay $15,000	(Argentina) Juan-Martín Aranguren (Argentina) Alejandro Fabbri; 6–2, 7–6^{(7–2)}	(Spain) Pablo Santos (Spain) Gabriel Trujillo Soler	(Italy) Alessio di Mauro (Uruguay) Marcel Felder	(Spain) Gabriel Trujillo Soler (Argentina) Juan-Martín Aranguren (Austria) Philipp Oswald (Italy) Thomas Fabbiano
May 24	South Africa F2 Futures; Durban, South Africa; Hard $15,000	(Austria) Nikolaus Moser; 6–3, 5–7, 6–2	(Switzerland) Adrien Bossel	(Greece) Theodoros Angelinos (South Africa) Raven Klaasen	(United Kingdom) Joshua Milton (Austria) Richard Ruckelshausen (South Africa) Andrew Anderson (Russia) Sergei Krotiouk
May 24	South Africa F2 Futures; Durban, South Africa; Hard $15,000	(South Africa) Raven Klaasen (Austria) Richard Ruckelshausen; 6–4, 5–7, [10–8]	(Austria) Nikolaus Moser (Austria) Max Raditschnigg	(Greece) Theodoros Angelinos (South Africa) Raven Klaasen	(United Kingdom) Joshua Milton (Austria) Richard Ruckelshausen (South Africa) Andrew Anderson (Russia) Sergei Krotiouk
May 24	B&H F6 Futures (Bosnia and Herzegovina) Prijedor, Bosnia & Herzegovina; Clay $10,000	(Croatia) Franko Škugor; 6–3, 6–4	(Netherlands) Miliaan Niesten	(Croatia) Mislav Hižak (Croatia) Nikola Mektić	(Serbia) Nikola Ćaćić (Austria) Herbert Wiltschnig (Czech Republic) Jiří Školoudík (Serbia) Arsenije Zlatanović
May 24	B&H F6 Futures (Bosnia and Herzegovina) Prijedor, Bosnia & Herzegovina; Clay $10,000	(Croatia) Toni Androić (Croatia) Franko Škugor; 4–6, 6–3, [10–2]	(Croatia) Nikola Mektić (Croatia) Ivan Zovko	(Croatia) Mislav Hižak (Croatia) Nikola Mektić	(Serbia) Nikola Ćaćić (Austria) Herbert Wiltschnig (Czech Republic) Jiří Školoudík (Serbia) Arsenije Zlatanović
May 24	Brazil F8 Futures; Juiz de Fora, Brazil; Clay $10,000	(Brazil) Leonardo Kirche; 4–6, 6–3, 7–6^{(7–4)}	(Brazil) Rodrigo Guidolin	(Brazil) Eládio Ribeiro Neto (Brazil) Marcelo Demoliner	(Argentina) Cristhian Ignacio Benedetti (Ecuador) Iván Endara (Italy) Daniel Alejandro López (Brazil) Ricardo Siggia
May 24	Brazil F8 Futures; Juiz de Fora, Brazil; Clay $10,000	(Mexico) Luis Díaz Barriga (Mexico) Miguel Ángel Reyes-Varela; 6–2, 6–0	(Brazil) Gustavo Junqueira de Andrade (Brazil) Thales Turini	(Brazil) Eládio Ribeiro Neto (Brazil) Marcelo Demoliner	(Argentina) Cristhian Ignacio Benedetti (Ecuador) Iván Endara (Italy) Daniel Alejandro López (Brazil) Ricardo Siggia
May 24	Poland F2 Futures; Kraków, Poland; Clay $10,000	(Czech Republic) Dušan Lojda; 6–2, 7–5	(Chile) Adrián García	(Chile) Guillermo Hormazábal (France) Tak Khunn Wang	(Germany) Alexander Flock (Canada) Érik Chvojka (Ukraine) Stanislav Poplavskyy (Belarus) Nikolai Fidirko
May 24	Poland F2 Futures; Kraków, Poland; Clay $10,000	(Poland) Marcin Gawron (Poland) Andriej Kapaś; 3–6, 6–0, [10–7]	(Poland) Błażej Koniusz (Poland) Grzegorz Panfil	(Chile) Guillermo Hormazábal (France) Tak Khunn Wang	(Germany) Alexander Flock (Canada) Érik Chvojka (Ukraine) Stanislav Poplavskyy (Belarus) Nikolai Fidirko
May 24	Romania F2 Futures; Pitești, Romania; Clay $10,000	(Romania) Adrian Cruciat; 6–4, 7–6^{(7–5)}	(Ukraine) Artem Smirnov	(Romania) Andrei Mlendea (Romania) Răzvan Sabău	(France) Florian Reynet (Romania) Teodor-Dacian Crăciun (France) Maxime Teixeira (Romania) Robert Coman
May 24	Romania F2 Futures; Pitești, Romania; Clay $10,000	(Moldova) Radu Albot (Moldova) Andrei Ciumac; 2–6, 6–3, [10–7]	(Ukraine) Ivan Anikanov (Ukraine) Artem Smirnov	(Romania) Andrei Mlendea (Romania) Răzvan Sabău	(France) Florian Reynet (Romania) Teodor-Dacian Crăciun (France) Maxime Teixeira (Romania) Robert Coman
May 24	Slovenia F1 Futures; Kamnik, Slovenia; Clay $10,000	(Germany) Marcel Zimmermann; 3–6, 6–2, 6–4	(Slovenia) Blaž Rola	(France) Nicolas Rosenzweig (Serbia) Nikola Ćirić	(Croatia) Marko Mijačević (Austria) Marc Rath (Austria) Philip Lang (Austria) Michael Linzer
May 24	Slovenia F1 Futures; Kamnik, Slovenia; Clay $10,000	(Spain) Óscar Sabate-Bretos (Chile) Ricardo Urzúa-Rivera; 6–7^{(4–7)}, 6–3, [11–9]	(Germany) Gero Kretschmer (Germany) Alexander Satschko	(France) Nicolas Rosenzweig (Serbia) Nikola Ćirić	(Croatia) Marko Mijačević (Austria) Marc Rath (Austria) Philip Lang (Austria) Michael Linzer
May 24	Spain F18 Futures; Adeje, Spain; Hard $10,000	(Portugal) João Sousa; 7–5, 6–4	(Germany) David Thurner	(Spain) Gerard Granollers (Australia) Jarryd Maher	(Spain) Juan Lizariturry (United Kingdom) Richard Bloomfield (Spain) Agustín Bojé-Ordóñez (Russia) Ivan Nedelko
May 24	Spain F18 Futures; Adeje, Spain; Hard $10,000	(Spain) Georgi Rumenov Payakov (Portugal) João Sousa; 6–1, 6–4	(Spain) Agustín Bojé-Ordóñez (Spain) Marcelo Palacios-Siegenthale	(Spain) Gerard Granollers (Australia) Jarryd Maher	(Spain) Juan Lizariturry (United Kingdom) Richard Bloomfield (Spain) Agustín Bojé-Ordóñez (Russia) Ivan Nedelko
May 31	China F5 Futures; Wuhan, China; Hard $15,000	(Finland) Harri Heliövaara; 6–7^{(5–7)}, 6–4, 6–0	(South Korea) Lim Yong-kyu	(China) Gong Maoxin (China) Zhang Ze	(China) Ouyang Bowen (China) Chang Yu (China) Li Zhe (Chinese Taipei) Yi Chu-huan
May 31	China F5 Futures; Wuhan, China; Hard $15,000	(China) Gong Maoxin (China) Li Zhe; 7–5, 6–3	(China) Ma Ya-nan (China) Yu Xin-yuan	(China) Gong Maoxin (China) Zhang Ze	(China) Ouyang Bowen (China) Chang Yu (China) Li Zhe (Chinese Taipei) Yi Chu-huan
May 31	Spain F19 Futures; Lanzarote, Spain; Hard $15,000	(Portugal) João Sousa; 7–5, 6–4	(Switzerland) Michael Lammer	(France) Ludovic Walter (Spain) Guillermo Olaso	(United Kingdom) Matthew Short (Spain) Agustín Bojé-Ordóñez (Latvia) Kārlis Lejnieks (Spain) Gerard Granollers
May 31	Spain F19 Futures; Lanzarote, Spain; Hard $15,000	(Spain) Georgi Rumenov Payakov (Portugal) João Sousa; 7–6^{(7–4)}, 6–0	(Switzerland) Michael Lammer (France) Ludovic Walter	(France) Ludovic Walter (Spain) Guillermo Olaso	(United Kingdom) Matthew Short (Spain) Agustín Bojé-Ordóñez (Latvia) Kārlis Lejnieks (Spain) Gerard Granollers
May 31	Argentina F7 Futures; Neuquén, Argentina; Clay $10,000	(Argentina) Andrés Molteni; 6–4, 6–2	(Argentina) Diego Sebastián Schwartzman	(Argentina) Guillermo Durán (Argentina) Nicolás Pastor	(Argentina) Guillermo Bujniewicz (Argentina) Rodrigo Gómez Saigos (Argentina) Gabriel Alejandro Hidalgo (Argentina) Gastón-Arturo Grimolizzi
May 31	Argentina F7 Futures; Neuquén, Argentina; Clay $10,000	(Argentina) Nicolás Jara-Lozano (Argentina) Andrés Molteni; 6–3, 6–2	(Argentina) Rodrigo Gómez Saigos (Argentina) Gustavo Sterin	(Argentina) Guillermo Durán (Argentina) Nicolás Pastor	(Argentina) Guillermo Bujniewicz (Argentina) Rodrigo Gómez Saigos (Argentina) Gabriel Alejandro Hidalgo (Argentina) Gastón-Arturo Grimolizzi
May 31	B&H F7 Futures (Bosnia and Herzegovina) Kiseljak, Bosnia & Herzegovina; Clay $10,000	(Bosnia and Herzegovina) Mirza Bašić; 6–3, 6–0	(Netherlands) Miliaan Niesten	(Czech Republic) Jiří Školoudík (France) Thomas Cazes-Carrère	(Croatia) Antonio Šančić (France) Baptiste Dupuy (Serbia) Arsenije Zlatanović (Belgium) Julien Dubail
May 31	B&H F7 Futures (Bosnia and Herzegovina) Kiseljak, Bosnia & Herzegovina; Clay $10,000	(Serbia) Miljan Zekić (Serbia) Arsenije Zlatanović; 7–6^{(7–4)}, 4–6, [10–8]	(Bosnia and Herzegovina) Jasmin Ademović (Bosnia and Herzegovina) Sven Lalić	(Czech Republic) Jiří Školoudík (France) Thomas Cazes-Carrère	(Croatia) Antonio Šančić (France) Baptiste Dupuy (Serbia) Arsenije Zlatanović (Belgium) Julien Dubail
May 31	Brazil F9 Futures; Araguari, Brazil; Clay $10,000	(Brazil) Daniel Dutra da Silva; 6–3, 1–6, 6–1	(Brazil) Eládio Ribeiro Neto	(Brazil) Júlio Silva (Brazil) Tiago Lopes	(Brazil) Ricardo Siggia (Ecuador) Iván Endara (Brazil) José Pereira (Brazil) André Miele
May 31	Brazil F9 Futures; Araguari, Brazil; Clay $10,000	(Bolivia) Mauricio Doria-Medina (Brazil) Rodrigo-Antonio Grilli; 7–6^{(8–6)}, 3–6, [10–8]	(Brazil) Carlos Oliveira (Brazil) Júlio Silva	(Brazil) Júlio Silva (Brazil) Tiago Lopes	(Brazil) Ricardo Siggia (Ecuador) Iván Endara (Brazil) José Pereira (Brazil) André Miele
May 31	Guam F1 Futures; Tumon, Guam; Hard $10,000	(Japan) Tatsuma Ito; 6–2, 6–4	(Japan) Junn Mitsuhashi	(Japan) Toshihide Matsui (Japan) Tasuku Iwami	(Japan) Takuto Niki (Japan) Hiroyasu Ehara (Japan) Arata Onozawa (Australia) Joel Lindner
May 31	Guam F1 Futures; Tumon, Guam; Hard $10,000	(Japan) Tasuku Iwami (Japan) Toshihide Matsui; 3–6, 7–5, 6–4	(Philippines) Ruben Gonzales (United States) Christian Guevara	(Japan) Toshihide Matsui (Japan) Tasuku Iwami	(Japan) Takuto Niki (Japan) Hiroyasu Ehara (Japan) Arata Onozawa (Australia) Joel Lindner
May 31	Indonesia F1 Futures; Bandung, Indonesia; Hard (indoor) $10,000	(South Korea) Kim Young-jun; 6–4, 6–2	(South Korea) Choi Dong-whee	(Indonesia) Christopher Rungkat (United States) Nathan Thompson	(South Africa) Tucker Vorster (Australia) Dane Propoggia (Thailand) Weerapat Doakmaiklee (South Korea) An Jae-sung
May 31	Indonesia F1 Futures; Bandung, Indonesia; Hard (indoor) $10,000	(South Korea) An Jae-sung (South Korea) Kim Young-jun; 6–2, 5–7, [10–8]	(Indonesia) Elbert Sie (India) Karunuday Singh	(Indonesia) Christopher Rungkat (United States) Nathan Thompson	(South Africa) Tucker Vorster (Australia) Dane Propoggia (Thailand) Weerapat Doakmaiklee (South Korea) An Jae-sung
May 31	Italy F11 Futures; Bergamo, Italy; Clay $10,000	(Spain) Pedro Clar-Rosseló; 7–6^{(8–6)}, 2–6, 7–6^{(7–4)}	(Switzerland) Yann Marti	(Slovakia) Ivo Klec (Denmark) Frederik Nielsen	(Argentina) Alejandro Fabbri (Italy) Federico Torresi (United Kingdom) Morgan Phillips (Italy) Stefano Ianni
May 31	Italy F11 Futures; Bergamo, Italy; Clay $10,000	(Italy) Alessandro Giannessi (Denmark) Frederik Nielsen; 6–4, 7–6^{(7–3)}	(Italy) Stefano Ianni (Italy) Matteo Volante	(Slovakia) Ivo Klec (Denmark) Frederik Nielsen	(Argentina) Alejandro Fabbri (Italy) Federico Torresi (United Kingdom) Morgan Phillips (Italy) Stefano Ianni
May 31	Poland F3 Futures; Koszalin, Poland; Clay $10,000	(Poland) Jerzy Janowicz; 6–7^{(2–7)}, 6–3, 6–3	(Chile) Adrián García	(Belarus) Aliaksandr Bury (Poland) Grzegorz Panfil	(Belarus) Siarhei Betau (Poland) Błażej Koniusz (Chile) Guillermo Hormazábal (Poland) Marcin Gawron
May 31	Poland F3 Futures; Koszalin, Poland; Clay $10,000	(Poland) Błażej Koniusz (Poland) Grzegorz Panfil; 7–6^{(7–3)}, 6–3	(Belarus) Siarhei Betau (Hungary) Róbert Varga	(Belarus) Aliaksandr Bury (Poland) Grzegorz Panfil	(Belarus) Siarhei Betau (Poland) Błażej Koniusz (Chile) Guillermo Hormazábal (Poland) Marcin Gawron
May 31	Romania F3 Futures; Bacău, Romania; Clay $10,000	(France) Florian Reynet; 6–1, 6–3	(Moldova) Radu Albot	(Romania) Răzvan Sabău (Romania) Robert Coman	(Spain) Andoni Vivanco-Guzmán (Romania) Cosmin Georgescu (Romania) Dragoș Cristian Mîrtea (Romania) Dragoș Constantin Ignat
May 31	Romania F3 Futures; Bacău, Romania; Clay $10,000	(Ukraine) Ivan Anikanov (Moldova) Roman Tudoreanu; 6–3, 0–6, [10–7]	(Italy) Giulio Torroni (Italy) Marco Viola	(Romania) Răzvan Sabău (Romania) Robert Coman	(Spain) Andoni Vivanco-Guzmán (Romania) Cosmin Georgescu (Romania) Dragoș Cristian Mîrtea (Romania) Dragoș Constantin Ignat
May 31	Slovenia F2 Futures; Rogaska Slatina, Slovenia; Clay $10,000	(Croatia) Nikola Mektić; 6–3, 4–2 retired	(Ukraine) Denys Molchanov	(Slovenia) Blaž Rola (Canada) Steven Diez	(Spain) Óscar Sabate-Bretos (Spain) Javier Martí (Serbia) Nikola Ćirić (Spain) Carlos Calderón-Rodríguez
May 31	Slovenia F2 Futures; Rogaska Slatina, Slovenia; Clay $10,000	(Croatia) Nikola Mektić (Croatia) Ivan Zovko; 4–6, 6–0, [10–8]	(Spain) Óscar Burrieza (Spain) Javier Martí	(Slovenia) Blaž Rola (Canada) Steven Diez	(Spain) Óscar Sabate-Bretos (Spain) Javier Martí (Serbia) Nikola Ćirić (Spain) Carlos Calderón-Rodríguez
May 31	Tunisia F1 Futures; Tunis, Tunisia; Clay $10,000	(Spain) Sergio Gutiérrez Ferrol; 6–4, 6–2	(Tunisia) Malek Jaziri	(France) Augustin Gensse (France) Laurent Rochette	(Egypt) Mohamed Safwat (France) Mathieu Rodrigues (Morocco) Anas Fattar (Republic of Ireland) James McGee
May 31	Tunisia F1 Futures; Tunis, Tunisia; Clay $10,000	(France) Laurent Rochette (Russia) Mikhail Vasiliev; 6–0, 7–5	(Tunisia) Wessim Derbel (Tunisia) Anis Ghorbel	(France) Augustin Gensse (France) Laurent Rochette	(Egypt) Mohamed Safwat (France) Mathieu Rodrigues (Morocco) Anas Fattar (Republic of Ireland) James McGee

== June ==
Week of	Tournament	Winner	Runners-up	Semifinalists	Quarterfinalists
June 7	China F6 Futures; Jiaxing, China; Hard $15,000	(China) Wu Di; 7–5, 5–7, 6–4	(China) Gong Maoxin	(China) Li Zhe (Finland) Harri Heliövaara	(Chinese Taipei) Yang Tsung-hua (China) Zhang Ze (Chinese Taipei) Yi Chu-huan (South Korea) Cho Soong-jae
June 7	China F6 Futures; Jiaxing, China; Hard $15,000	(China) Gong Maoxin (China) Li Zhe; 6–4, 6–3	(China) Gao Peng (China) Gao Wan	(China) Li Zhe (Finland) Harri Heliövaara	(Chinese Taipei) Yang Tsung-hua (China) Zhang Ze (Chinese Taipei) Yi Chu-huan (South Korea) Cho Soong-jae
June 7	Netherlands F1 Futures; Apeldoorn, Netherlands; Clay $15,000	(Netherlands) Matwé Middelkoop; 6–1, 6–4	(France) Mathieu Rodrigues	(Moldova) Roman Borvanov (Spain) Pedro Clar Rosselló	(Netherlands) Wesley Koolhof (Germany) Cedrik-Marcel Stebe (Moldova) Andrei Gorban (France) Charles-Antoine Brézac
June 7	Netherlands F1 Futures; Apeldoorn, Netherlands; Clay $15,000	(Romania) Cătălin-Ionuț Gârd (Brazil) André Ghem; 7–6^{(7–5)}, 3–6, [12–10]	(Germany) Kevin Deden (Germany) Holger Fischer	(Moldova) Roman Borvanov (Spain) Pedro Clar Rosselló	(Netherlands) Wesley Koolhof (Germany) Cedrik-Marcel Stebe (Moldova) Andrei Gorban (France) Charles-Antoine Brézac
June 7	Spain F20 Futures; Puerto de la Cruz, Spain; Carpet $15,000	(France) Ludovic Walter; 4–6, 6–3, 7–6^{(7–4)}	(Switzerland) Michael Lammer	(Portugal) João Sousa (Spain) Carlos Gómez-Herrera	(Italy) Andrea Falgheri (Spain) Jaime Pulgar-García (Portugal) Martin Trueva (Spain) José Checa Calvo
June 7	Spain F20 Futures; Puerto de la Cruz, Spain; Carpet $15,000	(Spain) Georgi Rumenov Payakov (Portugal) João Sousa; 7–6^{(7–2)}, 6–2	(Spain) Carlos Gómez-Herrera (Spain) Roberto Ortega Olmedo	(Portugal) João Sousa (Spain) Carlos Gómez-Herrera	(Italy) Andrea Falgheri (Spain) Jaime Pulgar-García (Portugal) Martin Trueva (Spain) José Checa Calvo
June 7	USA F13 Futures; Loomis, United States; Hard $15,000	(United States) Michael Venus; 7–6^{(7–4)}, 1–6, 6–3	(Bulgaria) Dimitar Kutrovsky	(United States) Bryan Koniecko (United States) Nicholas Monroe	(Slovenia) Luka Gregorc (Israel) Amir Weintraub (Belarus) Kiryl Harbatsiuk (South Korea) Daniel Yoo
June 7	USA F13 Futures; Loomis, United States; Hard $15,000	(New Zealand) Marcus Daniell (United States) Michael Venus; 6–4, 6–4	(Australia) Nima Roshan (New Zealand) José Statham	(United States) Bryan Koniecko (United States) Nicholas Monroe	(Slovenia) Luka Gregorc (Israel) Amir Weintraub (Belarus) Kiryl Harbatsiuk (South Korea) Daniel Yoo
June 7	Argentina F8 Futures; Córdoba, Argentina; Clay $10,000	(Argentina) Marco Trungelliti; 6–3, 4–6, 6–2	(Argentina) Guillermo Durán	(Argentina) Antonio Pastorino (Argentina) Juan-Manuel Valverde	(Argentina) Andrés Molteni (Argentina) Rodrigo Gómez Saigos (Argentina) Agustín Picco (Argentina) Guillermo Bujniewicz
June 7	Argentina F8 Futures; Córdoba, Argentina; Clay $10,000	(Argentina) Lionel Noviski (Argentina) Antonio Pastorino; 6–1, 6–0	(Chile) Rodrigo Pérez (Argentina) Juan-Manuel Valverde	(Argentina) Antonio Pastorino (Argentina) Juan-Manuel Valverde	(Argentina) Andrés Molteni (Argentina) Rodrigo Gómez Saigos (Argentina) Agustín Picco (Argentina) Guillermo Bujniewicz
June 7	Indonesia F2 Futures; Tarakan, Indonesia; Hard (indoor) $10,000	(Indonesia) Christopher Rungkat; 6–3, 0–6, 6–2	(South Korea) An Jae-sung	(Sri Lanka) Harshana Godamanna (Russia) Ilia Starkov	(South Africa) Tucker Vorster (United States) Devin Britton (India) Vijay Sundar Prashanth (Indonesia) Sunu Wahyu Trijati
June 7	Indonesia F2 Futures; Tarakan, Indonesia; Hard (indoor) $10,000	(Thailand) Weerapat Doakmaiklee (Thailand) Kittiphong Wachiramanowong; 6–3, 7–5	(India) Vijayant Malik (India) Vivek Shokeen	(Sri Lanka) Harshana Godamanna (Russia) Ilia Starkov	(South Africa) Tucker Vorster (United States) Devin Britton (India) Vijay Sundar Prashanth (Indonesia) Sunu Wahyu Trijati
June 7	Italy F12 Futures; Mestre, Italy; Clay $10,000	(Italy) Matteo Viola; 7–6^{(7–2)}, 6–2	(Italy) Matteo Marrai	(Italy) Andrea Stoppini (Italy) Thomas Fabbiano	(Argentina) Leandro Migani (Serbia) Nikola Ćirić (Croatia) Franko Škugor (Italy) Lorenzo Giustino
June 7	Italy F12 Futures; Mestre, Italy; Clay $10,000	(Italy) Walter Trusendi (Italy) Matteo Viola; 6–7^{(8–10)}, 6–1, [10–2]	(Serbia) Nikola Ćirić (Croatia) Franko Škugor	(Italy) Andrea Stoppini (Italy) Thomas Fabbiano	(Argentina) Leandro Migani (Serbia) Nikola Ćirić (Croatia) Franko Škugor (Italy) Lorenzo Giustino
June 7	Japan F5 Futures; Karuizawa, Japan; Clay $10,000	(Australia) Mark Verryth; 6–1, 6–4	(Japan) Hiroki Moriya	(South Korea) Lee Dong-kyu (South Korea) Kim Hyun-joon	(South Korea) Kim Dylan Seong-kwan (South Korea) Lee Chul-hee (Japan) Shuichi Sekiguchi (South Korea) Kwon Oh-hee
June 7	Japan F5 Futures; Karuizawa, Japan; Clay $10,000	(South Korea) Kwon Oh-hee (South Korea) Lee Chul-hee; 7–5, 6–3	(Japan) Fumiaki Kita (Japan) Takuto Niki	(South Korea) Lee Dong-kyu (South Korea) Kim Hyun-joon	(South Korea) Kim Dylan Seong-kwan (South Korea) Lee Chul-hee (Japan) Shuichi Sekiguchi (South Korea) Kwon Oh-hee
June 7	Poland F4 Futures; Gliwice, Poland; Clay $10,000	(Czech Republic) Dušan Lojda; 7–6^{(9–7)}, 7–6^{(8–6)}	(Poland) Jerzy Janowicz	(Norway) Erling Tveit (Poland) Adam Chadaj	(Poland) Błażej Koniusz (Canada) Érik Chvojka (Germany) Patrick Taubert (Ukraine) Stanislav Poplavskyy
June 7	Poland F4 Futures; Gliwice, Poland; Clay $10,000	(Poland) Błażej Koniusz (Poland) Grzegorz Panfil; 6–3, 6–1	(Belarus) Nikolai Fidirko (Belarus) Andrei Vasilevski	(Norway) Erling Tveit (Poland) Adam Chadaj	(Poland) Błażej Koniusz (Canada) Érik Chvojka (Germany) Patrick Taubert (Ukraine) Stanislav Poplavskyy
June 7	Romania F4 Futures; Brașov, Romania; Clay $10,000	(Romania) Victor-Mugurel Anagnastopol; 6–2, 7–5	(Ukraine) Gleb Alekseenko	(Spain) Marc Giner (Romania) Marcel-Ioan Miron	(Moldova) Roman Tudoreanu (France) Romain Sichez (Romania) Victor Ioniță (Belgium) Alexandre Folie
June 7	Romania F4 Futures; Brașov, Romania; Clay $10,000	(Romania) Marcel-Ioan Miron (Romania) Paul-Mihai Puscasu; 6–3, 7–6^{(9–7)}	(Romania) Alexandru-Daniel Carpen (Romania) Laurentiu-Antoniu Erlic	(Spain) Marc Giner (Romania) Marcel-Ioan Miron	(Moldova) Roman Tudoreanu (France) Romain Sichez (Romania) Victor Ioniță (Belgium) Alexandre Folie
June 7	Slovenia F3 Futures; Maribor, Slovenia; Clay $10,000	(Slovenia) Blaž Rola; 2–6, 6–4, 6–4	(Hungary) György Balázs	(Slovenia) Aljaž Bedene (Germany) Alexander Flock	(Slovenia) Martin Rmuš (Austria) Nicolas Reissig (Spain) Javier Martí (Ukraine) Denys Molchanov
June 7	Slovenia F3 Futures; Maribor, Slovenia; Clay $10,000	(Slovenia) Martin Rmuš (Slovenia) Blaž Rola; 6–3, 6–3	(Spain) Javier Martí (Spain) Sergio Pérez Pérez	(Slovenia) Aljaž Bedene (Germany) Alexander Flock	(Slovenia) Martin Rmuš (Austria) Nicolas Reissig (Spain) Javier Martí (Ukraine) Denys Molchanov
June 7	Tunisia F2 Futures; Sfax, Tunisia; Hard $10,000	(Tunisia) Malek Jaziri; 6–4, 6–3	(France) Laurent Rochette	(Egypt) Mohamed Safwat (France) Rudy Coco	(Republic of Ireland) Colin O'Brien (Tunisia) Wael Kilani (Russia) Mikhail Vasiliev (Netherlands) Mark Vervoort
June 7	Tunisia F2 Futures; Sfax, Tunisia; Hard $10,000	(Italy) Claudio Grassi (Russia) Mikhail Vasiliev; 6–3, 6–3	(France) Dorian Descloix (France) Laurent Rochette	(Egypt) Mohamed Safwat (France) Rudy Coco	(Republic of Ireland) Colin O'Brien (Tunisia) Wael Kilani (Russia) Mikhail Vasiliev (Netherlands) Mark Vervoort
June 7	Venezuela F1 Futures; Maracaibo, Venezuela; Hard $10,000	(Colombia) Robert Farah; 6–3, 7–6^{(7–3)}	(Peru) Iván Miranda	(Venezuela) Piero Luisi (Venezuela) David Souto	(Mexico) Miguel Gallardo Valles (Guatemala) Julen Urigüen (Ecuador) Julio César Campozano (Venezuela) Roberto Maytín
June 7	Venezuela F1 Futures; Maracaibo, Venezuela; Hard $10,000	(Colombia) Juan Sebastián Cabal (Colombia) Robert Farah; 6–1, 7–5	(Mexico) Miguel Gallardo Valles (Colombia) Michael Quintero	(Venezuela) Piero Luisi (Venezuela) David Souto	(Mexico) Miguel Gallardo Valles (Guatemala) Julen Urigüen (Ecuador) Julio César Campozano (Venezuela) Roberto Maytín
June 14	France F8 Futures; Blois, France; Clay $15,000+H	(France) Jonathan Eysseric; 6–4, 4–6, 7–6^{(7–1)}	(Russia) Valery Rudnev	(Moldova) Andrei Gorban (France) Romain Jouan	(Argentina) Agustín Velotti (France) Xavier Pujo (France) Maxime Teixeira (France) Florian Dambes
June 14	France F8 Futures; Blois, France; Clay $15,000+H	(France) Jonathan Eysseric (France) Jérôme Inzerillo; 6–3, 6–2	(France) Pierre-Hugues Herbert (France) Xavier Pujo	(Moldova) Andrei Gorban (France) Romain Jouan	(Argentina) Agustín Velotti (France) Xavier Pujo (France) Maxime Teixeira (France) Florian Dambes
June 14	Italy F13 Futures; Padova, Italy; Clay $15,000	(Serbia) Nikola Ćirić; 4–6, 7–6^{(7–5)}, 7–6^{(7–3)}	(Italy) Matteo Marrai	(Italy) Stefano Galvani (Italy) Andrea Stoppini	(Italy) Francesco Piccari (Italy) Enrico Burzi (Portugal) Pedro Sousa (Italy) Matteo Viola
June 14	Italy F13 Futures; Padova, Italy; Clay $15,000	(Italy) Alessandro Giannessi (Italy) Federico Torresi; 6–1, 7–6^{(7–3)}	(Italy) Paolo Beninca (Italy) Matteo Viola	(Italy) Stefano Galvani (Italy) Andrea Stoppini	(Italy) Francesco Piccari (Italy) Enrico Burzi (Portugal) Pedro Sousa (Italy) Matteo Viola
June 14	Netherlands F2 Futures; Alkmaar, Netherlands; Clay $15,000	(Finland) Timo Nieminen; 6–1, 6–3	(Czech Republic) Michal Schmid	(Australia) Jason Kubler (Germany) Alexander Flock	(Netherlands) Matwé Middelkoop (Netherlands) Peter Lucassen (Belgium) Alexandre Folie (Poland) Sebastian Chylinski
June 14	Netherlands F2 Futures; Alkmaar, Netherlands; Clay $15,000	(Netherlands) Matwé Middelkoop (Netherlands Antilles) Martijn van Haasteren; 7–6^{(10–8)}, 6–4	(Finland) Timo Nieminen (Czech Republic) Michal Schmid	(Australia) Jason Kubler (Germany) Alexander Flock	(Netherlands) Matwé Middelkoop (Netherlands) Peter Lucassen (Belgium) Alexandre Folie (Poland) Sebastian Chylinski
June 14	USA F14 Futures; Davis, United States; Hard $15,000	(South Africa) Fritz Wolmarans; 6–3, 6–4	(Russia) Artem Sitak	(United States) Nicholas Monroe (New Zealand) José Statham	(New Zealand) Marcus Daniell (United States) Chris Wettengel (United States) Denis Zivkovic (New Zealand) Michael Venus
June 14	USA F14 Futures; Davis, United States; Hard $15,000	(United States) Brett Joelson (United States) Nicholas Monroe; 6–7^{(5–7)}, 6–2, [10–7]	(United States) John Paul Fruttero (Australia) Adam Hubble	(United States) Nicholas Monroe (New Zealand) José Statham	(New Zealand) Marcus Daniell (United States) Chris Wettengel (United States) Denis Zivkovic (New Zealand) Michael Venus
June 14	Argentina F9 Futures; Posadas, Argentina; Clay $10,000	(Chile) Guillermo Rivera Aránguiz; 6–3, 3–6, 6–3	(Argentina) Maximiliano Estévez	(Argentina) Cristhian Ignacio Benedetti (Argentina) Patricio Heras	(Argentina) Lionel Noviski (Argentina) Agustín Picco (Argentina) Joaquín-Jesús Monteferrario (Argentina) Antonio Pastorino
June 14	Argentina F9 Futures; Posadas, Argentina; Clay $10,000	(Argentina) Andrés Molteni (Argentina) Diego Sebastián Schwartzman; 6–2, 6–3	(Argentina) Lionel Noviski (Argentina) Antonio Pastorino	(Argentina) Cristhian Ignacio Benedetti (Argentina) Patricio Heras	(Argentina) Lionel Noviski (Argentina) Agustín Picco (Argentina) Joaquín-Jesús Monteferrario (Argentina) Antonio Pastorino
June 14	Germany F5 Futures; Cologne, Germany; Clay $10,000	(Germany) Jan-Lennard Struff; 7–6^{(7–5)}, 6–0	(Germany) Dennis Blömke	(Romania) Adrian Cruciat (Australia) James Lemke	(Romania) Andrei Mlendea (Czech Republic) Jiří Školoudík (Czech Republic) Roman Jebavý (Germany) Marcel Thiemann
June 14	Germany F5 Futures; Cologne, Germany; Clay $10,000	(Greece) Paris Gemouchidis (Chile) Hans Podlipnik Castillo; 6–4, 7–5	(Czech Republic) Roman Jebavý (Russia) Andrey Kumantsov	(Romania) Adrian Cruciat (Australia) James Lemke	(Romania) Andrei Mlendea (Czech Republic) Jiří Školoudík (Czech Republic) Roman Jebavý (Germany) Marcel Thiemann
June 14	Indonesia F3 Futures; Tegal, Indonesia; Hard $10,000	(South Korea) Kim Young-jun; 6–1, 6–2	(Russia) Sergei Krotiouk	(Russia) Ilia Starkov (Thailand) Kittiphong Wachiramanowong	(India) Vivek Shokeen (India) Rohan Gajjar (India) Ranjeet Virali-Murugesan (Chinese Taipei) Huang Liang-chi
June 14	Indonesia F3 Futures; Tegal, Indonesia; Hard $10,000	(Indonesia) Christopher Rungkat (United States) Nathan Thompson; 7–6^{(7–5)}, 6–4	(Thailand) Weerapat Doakmaiklee (Thailand) Kittiphong Wachiramanowong	(Russia) Ilia Starkov (Thailand) Kittiphong Wachiramanowong	(India) Vivek Shokeen (India) Rohan Gajjar (India) Ranjeet Virali-Murugesan (Chinese Taipei) Huang Liang-chi
June 14	Japan F6 Futures; Kusatsu, Japan; Carpet $10,000	(Japan) Tasuku Iwami; 6–4, 6–4	(Japan) Hiroki Kondo	(Japan) Yuichi Ito (Japan) Hiroki Moriya	(Chinese Taipei) Lee Hsin-han (Japan) Takuto Niki (Japan) Toshihide Matsui (Japan) Yaoki Ishii
June 14	Japan F6 Futures; Kusatsu, Japan; Carpet $10,000	(Chinese Taipei) Chen I-ta (Chinese Taipei) Hsieh Cheng-peng; 6–4, 7–5	(Japan) Yuichi Ito (Chinese Taipei) Lee Hsin-han	(Japan) Yuichi Ito (Japan) Hiroki Moriya	(Chinese Taipei) Lee Hsin-han (Japan) Takuto Niki (Japan) Toshihide Matsui (Japan) Yaoki Ishii
June 14	Morocco F3 Futures; Rabat, Morocco; Clay $10,000	(France) Augustin Gensse; 6–3, 6–4	(Spain) Gerard Granollers	(Canada) Steven Diez (Spain) Carlos Boluda-Purkiss	(Belgium) Bart Govaerts (France) Florian Reynet (United States) Blake Strode (Morocco) Yassine Idmbarek
June 14	Morocco F3 Futures; Rabat, Morocco; Clay $10,000	(France) Marc Auradou (France) Gleb Sakharov; 7–6^{(7–3)}, 7–5	(United States) Blake Strode (United States) Christian Welte	(Canada) Steven Diez (Spain) Carlos Boluda-Purkiss	(Belgium) Bart Govaerts (France) Florian Reynet (United States) Blake Strode (Morocco) Yassine Idmbarek
June 14	Serbia F1 Futures; Belgrade, Serbia; Clay $10,000	(Ukraine) Oleksandr Nedovyesov; 6–4, 6–2	(Serbia) Dušan Lajović	(Bulgaria) Valentin Dimov (Serbia) Arsenije Zlatanović	(Montenegro) Goran Tošić (Serbia) David Savić (Serbia) Aleksander Slović (Serbia) Vladimir Obradović
June 14	Serbia F1 Futures; Belgrade, Serbia; Clay $10,000	(Ukraine) Vadim Alekseenko (Ukraine) Oleksandr Nedovyesov; 7–6^{(7–5)}, 6–3	(North Macedonia) Predrag Rusevski (Serbia) Aleksander Slović	(Bulgaria) Valentin Dimov (Serbia) Arsenije Zlatanović	(Montenegro) Goran Tošić (Serbia) David Savić (Serbia) Aleksander Slović (Serbia) Vladimir Obradović
June 14	Spain F21 Futures; La Palma, Spain; Hard $10,000	(Spain) Agustin Bojé-Ordóñez; 6–3, 5–7, 6–4	(Spain) Miguel Ángel López Jaén	(Spain) Georgi Rumenov Payakov (Lithuania) Laurynas Grigelis	(Spain) Pablo Martín-Adalia (Italy) Uros Vico (Republic of Ireland) Barry King (Spain) David Cañudas-Fernández
June 14	Spain F21 Futures; La Palma, Spain; Hard $10,000	(Spain) Abraham González-Jiménez (Spain) Miguel Ángel López Jaén; Walkover	(Spain) Jaime Pulgar-García (Spain) Javier Pulgar-García	(Spain) Georgi Rumenov Payakov (Lithuania) Laurynas Grigelis	(Spain) Pablo Martín-Adalia (Italy) Uros Vico (Republic of Ireland) Barry King (Spain) David Cañudas-Fernández
June 14	Tunisia F3 Futures; Kelibia, Tunisia; Hard $10,000	(France) Laurent Rochette; 3–6, 7–6^{(7–1)}, 6–1	(France) Dorian Descloix	(Republic of Ireland) Colin O'Brien (Russia) Mikhail Vasiliev	(Italy) Massimo Capone (France) Rudy Coco (Egypt) Mohamed Safwat (Kuwait) Abdullah Maqdes
June 14	Tunisia F3 Futures; Kelibia, Tunisia; Hard $10,000	(France) Laurent Rochette (Russia) Mikhail Vasiliev; 6–3, 1–6, [10–6]	(Republic of Ireland) James Cluskey (Republic of Ireland) Colin O'Brien	(Republic of Ireland) Colin O'Brien (Russia) Mikhail Vasiliev	(Italy) Massimo Capone (France) Rudy Coco (Egypt) Mohamed Safwat (Kuwait) Abdullah Maqdes
June 14	Venezuela F2 Futures; Coro, Venezuela; Hard $10,000	(Colombia) Juan Sebastián Cabal; 6–4, 6–1	(Peru) Iván Miranda	(Venezuela) Román Recarte (Venezuela) David Souto	(Venezuela) Luis David Martínez (Mexico) Antonio Ruiz-González (Mexico) César Ramírez (Guatemala) Christopher Díaz Figueroa
June 14	Venezuela F2 Futures; Coro, Venezuela; Hard $10,000	(Colombia) Juan Sebastián Cabal (Colombia) Robert Farah; 7–6^{(7–5)}, 7–6^{(8–6)}	(Mexico) Luis Díaz Barriga (Mexico) Miguel Ángel Reyes-Varela	(Venezuela) Román Recarte (Venezuela) David Souto	(Venezuela) Luis David Martínez (Mexico) Antonio Ruiz-González (Mexico) César Ramírez (Guatemala) Christopher Díaz Figueroa
June 21	France F9 Futures; Toulon, France; Clay $15,000	(France) Augustin Gensse; 6–1, 6–4	(Canada) Philip Bester	(France) Frédéric Jeanclaude (Monaco) Guillaume Couillard	(France) Tak Khunn Wang (France) Romain Jouan (France) Maxime Teixeira (France) Dorian Descloix
June 21	France F9 Futures; Toulon, France; Clay $15,000	(Canada) Philip Bester (France) Jonathan Eysseric; 6–3, 6–4	(United States) Ashwin Kumar (India) Rupesh Roy	(France) Frédéric Jeanclaude (Monaco) Guillaume Couillard	(France) Tak Khunn Wang (France) Romain Jouan (France) Maxime Teixeira (France) Dorian Descloix
June 21	Malaysia F1 Futures; Kuala Lumpur, Malaysia; Hard $15,000	(Chinese Taipei) Yang Tsung-hua; 6–2, 6–2	(South Korea) Kim Young-jun	(United States) Nathan Thompson (Chinese Taipei) Yi Chu-huan	(India) Karan Rastogi (Uzbekistan) Murad Inoyatov (Chinese Taipei) Chen Ti (Australia) Kaden Hensel
June 21	Malaysia F1 Futures; Kuala Lumpur, Malaysia; Hard $15,000	(Chinese Taipei) Yang Tsung-hua (Chinese Taipei) Yi Chu-huan; 6–3, 6–3	(Australia) Kaden Hensel (Australia) Dane Propoggia	(United States) Nathan Thompson (Chinese Taipei) Yi Chu-huan	(India) Karan Rastogi (Uzbekistan) Murad Inoyatov (Chinese Taipei) Chen Ti (Australia) Kaden Hensel
June 21	Netherlands F3 Futures; Rotterdam, Netherlands; Clay $15,000	(Netherlands) Thomas Schoorel; 6–3, 4–6, 6–4	(Austria) Johannes Ager	(France) Thomas Cazes-Carrère (Netherlands) Matwé Middelkoop	(Denmark) Frederik Nielsen (Netherlands) Tim van Terheijden (Germany) Alexander Flock (France) Clément Reix
June 21	Netherlands F3 Futures; Rotterdam, Netherlands; Clay $15,000	(Denmark) Frederik Nielsen (France) Alexandre Renard; 6–3, 6–3	(Slovakia) Ivo Klec (Netherlands) Bas van der Valk	(France) Thomas Cazes-Carrère (Netherlands) Matwé Middelkoop	(Denmark) Frederik Nielsen (Netherlands) Tim van Terheijden (Germany) Alexander Flock (France) Clément Reix
June 21	Norway F1 Futures; Gausdal, Norway; Hard $15,000	(Netherlands) Igor Sijsling; 7–5 retired	(Italy) Riccardo Ghedin	(Finland) Juho Paukku (Switzerland) Alexander Sadecky	(Switzerland) Adrien Bossel (Netherlands) Xander Spong (Austria) Nikolaus Moser (Sweden) Michael Ryderstedt
June 21	Norway F1 Futures; Gausdal, Norway; Hard $15,000	(Finland) Harri Heliövaara (Finland) Juho Paukku; 2–6, 6–4, [10–5]	(Italy) Riccardo Ghedin (France) Fabrice Martin	(Finland) Juho Paukku (Switzerland) Alexander Sadecky	(Switzerland) Adrien Bossel (Netherlands) Xander Spong (Austria) Nikolaus Moser (Sweden) Michael Ryderstedt
June 21	USA F15 Futures; Chico, United States; Hard $15,000	(South Korea) Daniel Yoo; 2–6, 6–4, 7–6^{(7–3)}	(United States) Greg Ouellette	(South Africa) Raven Klaasen (Bulgaria) Dimitar Kutrovsky	(United States) Denis Zivkovic (United States) Todd Paul (United States) Jack Sock (United States) Conor Pollock
June 21	USA F15 Futures; Chico, United States; Hard $15,000	(Australia) Nima Roshan (New Zealand) José Statham; 6–3, 0–6, [10–8]	(Bulgaria) Dimitar Kutrovsky (United States) Jack Sock	(South Africa) Raven Klaasen (Bulgaria) Dimitar Kutrovsky	(United States) Denis Zivkovic (United States) Todd Paul (United States) Jack Sock (United States) Conor Pollock
June 21	Argentina F10 Futures; Posadas, Argentina; Clay $10,000	(Argentina) Andrés Molteni; 6–3, 6–0	(Argentina) Antonio Pastorino	(Argentina) Martín Ríos-Benítez (Argentina) Patricio Heras	(Argentina) Gastón Giussani (Argentina) Cristhian Ignacio Benedetti (Argentina) Agustín Picco (Brazil) Tiago Lopes
June 21	Argentina F10 Futures; Posadas, Argentina; Clay $10,000	(Argentina) Guillermo Durán (Argentina) Agustín Picco; 4–6, 7–6^{(7–1)}, [10–5]	(Argentina) Joaquín-Jesús Monteferrario (Argentina) Antonio Pastorino	(Argentina) Martín Ríos-Benítez (Argentina) Patricio Heras	(Argentina) Gastón Giussani (Argentina) Cristhian Ignacio Benedetti (Argentina) Agustín Picco (Brazil) Tiago Lopes
June 21	Germany F6 Futures; Wolfsburg, Germany; Clay $10,000	(Australia) James Lemke; 6–4, 6–2	(Czech Republic) Roman Jebavý	(Hungary) Ádám Kellner (Belarus) Siarhei Betau	(Chile) Hans Podlipnik Castillo (Slovakia) Miloslav Mečíř Jr. (Republic of Ireland) James McGee (Russia) Andrey Kumantsov
June 21	Germany F6 Futures; Wolfsburg, Germany; Clay $10,000	(Belarus) Siarhei Betau (Russia) Andrey Kumantsov; 6–3, 6–3	(Hungary) Ádám Kellner (Hungary) Zoltán Nagy	(Hungary) Ádám Kellner (Belarus) Siarhei Betau	(Chile) Hans Podlipnik Castillo (Slovakia) Miloslav Mečíř Jr. (Republic of Ireland) James McGee (Russia) Andrey Kumantsov
June 21	Italy F14 Futures; Aosta, Italy; Clay $10,000	(Italy) Matteo Marrai; 6–2, 6–3	(Colombia) Alejandro González	(Italy) Giulio Torroni (Italy) Federico Torresi	(Colombia) Cristian Rodríguez (Italy) Damiano Di Ienno (Italy) Marco Sattanino (Russia) Mikhail Vasiliev
June 21	Italy F14 Futures; Aosta, Italy; Clay $10,000	(United Kingdom) Morgan Phillips (Austria) Bertram Steinberger; 7–5, 6–7^{(4–7)}, [13–11]	(Italy) Federico Torresi (Italy) Luca Vanni	(Italy) Giulio Torroni (Italy) Federico Torresi	(Colombia) Cristian Rodríguez (Italy) Damiano Di Ienno (Italy) Marco Sattanino (Russia) Mikhail Vasiliev
June 21	Japan F7 Futures; Tokyo, Japan; Carpet $10,000	(Japan) Hiroki Kondo; 7–6^{(7–4)}, 7–6^{(7–5)}	(Japan) Toshihide Matsui	(South Korea) Kwon Oh-hee (Japan) Tasuku Iwami	(Japan) Yuichi Ito (Japan) Hiroki Moriya (United States) Chris Kwon (South Korea) Kang Sung-kyun
June 21	Japan F7 Futures; Tokyo, Japan; Carpet $10,000	(Japan) Tasuku Iwami (Japan) Hiroki Kondo; 7–6^{(7–2)}	(South Korea) Choi Jae-won (South Korea) Kim Hyun-joon	(South Korea) Kwon Oh-hee (Japan) Tasuku Iwami	(Japan) Yuichi Ito (Japan) Hiroki Moriya (United States) Chris Kwon (South Korea) Kang Sung-kyun
June 21	Morocco F4 Futures; Kenitra, Morocco; Clay $10,000	(France) Florian Reynet; 1–6, 6–2, 6–2	(Spain) Gerard Granollers	(Spain) Carlos Boluda-Purkiss (Belgium) Yannik Reuter	(Morocco) Anas Fattar (United States) Blake Strode (Belgium) Bart Govaerts (United Kingdom) James Feaver
June 21	Morocco F4 Futures; Kenitra, Morocco; Clay $10,000	(Spain) Carlos Boluda-Purkiss (Spain) Pedro Rico García; 6–3, 6–4	(Spain) Gerard Granollers (Spain) Jordi Samper Montaña	(Spain) Carlos Boluda-Purkiss (Belgium) Yannik Reuter	(Morocco) Anas Fattar (United States) Blake Strode (Belgium) Bart Govaerts (United Kingdom) James Feaver
June 21	Serbia F2 Futures; Belgrade, Serbia; Clay $10,000	(Serbia) Nikola Ćirić; 7–6^{(7–4)}, 4–6, 6–4	(Austria) Nicolas Reissig	(Montenegro) Goran Tošić (Slovenia) Blaž Rola	(Ukraine) Oleksandr Nedovyesov (Serbia) Dušan Lajović (Serbia) Marko Djokovic (Austria) Philip Lang
June 21	Serbia F2 Futures; Belgrade, Serbia; Clay $10,000	(Ukraine) Vadim Alekseenko (Ukraine) Oleksandr Nedovyesov; 6–1, 6–3	(Serbia) Vladimir Obradović (Serbia) Arsenije Zlatanović	(Montenegro) Goran Tošić (Slovenia) Blaž Rola	(Ukraine) Oleksandr Nedovyesov (Serbia) Dušan Lajović (Serbia) Marko Djokovic (Austria) Philip Lang
June 21	Spain F22 Futures; Melilla, Spain; Hard $10,000	(Spain) Miguel Ángel López Jaén; 6–4, 6–4	(Spain) Pablo Martín-Adalia	(France) Rudy Coco (Lithuania) Laurynas Grigelis	(France) Simon Cauvard (Canada) Steven Diez (Spain) Roberto Ortega Olmedo (Spain) Andoni Vivanco-Guzmán
June 21	Spain F22 Futures; Melilla, Spain; Hard $10,000	(Spain) Carlos Gómez-Herrera (Spain) Abraham González-Jiménez; 6–3, 6–2	(Italy) Erik Crepaldi (Italy) Claudio Grassi	(France) Rudy Coco (Lithuania) Laurynas Grigelis	(France) Simon Cauvard (Canada) Steven Diez (Spain) Roberto Ortega Olmedo (Spain) Andoni Vivanco-Guzmán
June 21	Venezuela F3 Futures; Barquisimeto, Venezuela; Hard $10,000	(Colombia) Robert Farah; 6–4, 6–2	(Ecuador) Iván Endara	(Colombia) Juan Sebastián Cabal (Venezuela) David Souto	(Ecuador) Julio César Campozano (Mexico) Miguel Gallardo Valles (Mexico) Daniel Garza (Peru) Rodrigo Sánchez
June 21	Venezuela F3 Futures; Barquisimeto, Venezuela; Hard $10,000	(Mexico) Daniel Garza (Mexico) Antonio Ruiz-Rosales; 6–0, 6–1	(Mexico) Tigre Hank (Greece) Vlademyros Mavropoulos-Stoliarenko	(Colombia) Juan Sebastián Cabal (Venezuela) David Souto	(Ecuador) Julio César Campozano (Mexico) Miguel Gallardo Valles (Mexico) Daniel Garza (Peru) Rodrigo Sánchez
June 28	France F10 Futures; Montauban, France; Clay $15,000+H	(France) Laurent Rochette; 7–6^{(7–4)}, 6–1	(France) Florian Reynet	(Austria) Andreas Haider-Maurer (France) Jonathan Eysseric	(France) Frédéric Jeanclaude (France) Dorian Descloix (France) Clément Reix (Canada) Philip Bester
June 28	France F10 Futures; Montauban, France; Clay $15,000+H	(Canada) Philip Bester (France) Jonathan Eysseric; Walkover	(France) Julien Obry (France) Albano Olivetti	(Austria) Andreas Haider-Maurer (France) Jonathan Eysseric	(France) Frédéric Jeanclaude (France) Dorian Descloix (France) Clément Reix (Canada) Philip Bester
June 28	Germany F7 Futures; Kassel, Germany; Clay $15,000+H	(Uzbekistan) Farrukh Dustov; 6–4, 6–4	(Russia) Andrey Kuznetsov	(Australia) James Lemke (Slovakia) Ivo Klec	(Germany) Marcel Zimmermann (Germany) Tim Pütz (Austria) Johannes Ager (Germany) Jean Zietsman
June 28	Germany F7 Futures; Kassel, Germany; Clay $15,000+H	(Slovakia) Ivo Klec (Germany) Alexander Satschko; 6–1, 6–7^{(3–7)}, [12–10]	(Russia) Andrey Kuznetsov (Russia) Denis Matsukevich	(Australia) James Lemke (Slovakia) Ivo Klec	(Germany) Marcel Zimmermann (Germany) Tim Pütz (Austria) Johannes Ager (Germany) Jean Zietsman
June 28	Italy F15 Futures; Bologna, Italy; Clay $15,000	(Italy) Andrea Stoppini; 6–1, 7–6^{(7–3)}	(Italy) Andrea Arnaboldi	(Italy) Stefano Galvani (Colombia) Alejandro González	(Italy) Jacopo Marchegiani (Italy) Stefano Ianni (Italy) Antonio Comporto (Italy) Massimo Capone
June 28	Italy F15 Futures; Bologna, Italy; Clay $15,000	(Italy) Massimo Capone (Italy) Marco Viola; 6–4, 5–7, [10–8]	(Italy) Jacopo Marchegiani (Italy) Andrea Stoppini	(Italy) Stefano Galvani (Colombia) Alejandro González	(Italy) Jacopo Marchegiani (Italy) Stefano Ianni (Italy) Antonio Comporto (Italy) Massimo Capone
June 28	Malaysia F2 Futures; Kuala Lumpur, Malaysia; Hard $15,000	(India) Rohan Gajjar; 7–6^{(7–2)}, 6–1	(Australia) Kaden Hensel	(India) Ranjeet Virali-Murugesan (South Africa) Nikala Scholtz	(Australia) Andrew Thomas (Uzbekistan) Murad Inoyatov (South Africa) Ruan Roelofse (United States) Nathan Thompson
June 28	Malaysia F2 Futures; Kuala Lumpur, Malaysia; Hard $15,000	(Australia) Kaden Hensel (Australia) Dane Propoggia; 6–1, 7–6^{(7–1)}	(Indonesia) Christopher Rungkat (United States) Nathan Thompson	(India) Ranjeet Virali-Murugesan (South Africa) Nikala Scholtz	(Australia) Andrew Thomas (Uzbekistan) Murad Inoyatov (South Africa) Ruan Roelofse (United States) Nathan Thompson
June 28	Netherlands F4 Futures; Breda, Netherlands; Clay $15,000+H	(Netherlands) Thomas Schoorel; 6–2, 7–6^{(7–5)}	(Netherlands) Jesse Huta Galung	(Germany) Gero Kretschmer (France) Mathieu Rodrigues	(Belarus) Uladzimir Ignatik (Belarus) Nikolai Fidirko (Canada) Chris Klingemann (Denmark) Frederik Nielsen
June 28	Netherlands F4 Futures; Breda, Netherlands; Clay $15,000+H	(Netherlands) Matwé Middelkoop (Netherlands) Thomas Schoorel; 4–6, 6–3, [10–6]	(Ukraine) Aleksandr Agafonov (Uruguay) Marcel Felder	(Germany) Gero Kretschmer (France) Mathieu Rodrigues	(Belarus) Uladzimir Ignatik (Belarus) Nikolai Fidirko (Canada) Chris Klingemann (Denmark) Frederik Nielsen
June 28	Norway F2 Futures; Gausdal, Norway; Hard $15,000	(Switzerland) Alexander Sadecky; 7–5, 6–3	(France) Fabrice Martin	(Sweden) Michael Ryderstedt (Finland) Harri Heliövaara	(United Kingdom) Alexander Ward (France) Ludovic Walter (Finland) Timo Nieminen (Finland) Juho Paukku
June 28	Norway F2 Futures; Gausdal, Norway; Hard $15,000	(Finland) Harri Heliövaara (Finland) Juho Paukku; 6–3, 1–6, [10–7]	(Sweden) Carl Bergman (Sweden) Stefan Borg	(Sweden) Michael Ryderstedt (Finland) Harri Heliövaara	(United Kingdom) Alexander Ward (France) Ludovic Walter (Finland) Timo Nieminen (Finland) Juho Paukku
June 28	Spain F23 Futures; Palma del Río, Spain; Hard $15,000	(Belgium) Ruben Bemelmans; 4–6, 6–4, 7–6^{(7–1)}	(Belgium) Niels Desein	(Russia) Alexander Kudryavtsev (Spain) Pablo Carreño Busta	(Netherlands) Miliaan Niesten (Canada) Steven Diez (Russia) Evgeny Kirillov (Spain) Miguel Ángel López Jaén
June 28	Spain F23 Futures; Palma del Río, Spain; Hard $15,000	(Russia) Evgeny Kirillov (Russia) Alexander Kudryavtsev; 6–4, 6–2	(Spain) Marc Fornell (Spain) Pablo Martín-Adalia	(Russia) Alexander Kudryavtsev (Spain) Pablo Carreño Busta	(Netherlands) Miliaan Niesten (Canada) Steven Diez (Russia) Evgeny Kirillov (Spain) Miguel Ángel López Jaén
June 28	Argentina F11 Futures; Obera, Argentina; Clay $10,000	(Argentina) Pablo Galdón; 7–6^{(7–4)}, 6–4	(Argentina) Andrés Molteni	(Argentina) Alejandro Fabbri (Argentina) Antonio Pastorino	(Argentina) Agustín Picco (Argentina) Guillermo Durán (Argentina) Martín Ríos-Benítez (Argentina) Juan-Manuel Valverde
June 28	Argentina F11 Futures; Obera, Argentina; Clay $10,000	(Argentina) Andrés Molteni (Argentina) Diego Sebastián Schwartzman; 3–6, 6–2, [10–4]	(Argentina) Gastón Giussani (Argentina) Joaquín-Jesús Monteferrario	(Argentina) Alejandro Fabbri (Argentina) Antonio Pastorino	(Argentina) Agustín Picco (Argentina) Guillermo Durán (Argentina) Martín Ríos-Benítez (Argentina) Juan-Manuel Valverde
June 28	Brazil F13 Futures; Araçatuba, Brazil; Clay $10,000	(Brazil) Eládio Ribeiro Neto; 6–2, 6–3	(Brazil) Carlos Oliveira	(Brazil) André Miele (Brazil) Leonardo Kirche	(Brazil) Caio Zampieri (Brazil) Fernando Romboli (Brazil) Rodrigo Guidolin (Brazil) Rogério Dutra da Silva
June 28	Brazil F13 Futures; Araçatuba, Brazil; Clay $10,000	(Brazil) Rogério Dutra da Silva (Brazil) Caio Zampieri; 7–6^{(9–7)}, 6–4	(Brazil) Carlos Oliveira (Brazil) Fernando Romboli	(Brazil) André Miele (Brazil) Leonardo Kirche	(Brazil) Caio Zampieri (Brazil) Fernando Romboli (Brazil) Rodrigo Guidolin (Brazil) Rogério Dutra da Silva
June 28	Great Britain F8 Futures (United Kingdom) Manchester, Great Britain; Grass $10,000	(United Kingdom) James Ward; 6–2, 7–6^{(7–1)}	(United Kingdom) Jamie Baker	(United Kingdom) David Rice (United Kingdom) Daniel Evans	(Lithuania) Laurynas Grigelis (India) Vishnu Vardhan (United Kingdom) Josh Goodall (India) Divij Sharan
June 28	Great Britain F8 Futures (United Kingdom) Manchester, Great Britain; Grass $10,000	(India) Divij Sharan (India) Vishnu Vardhan; 6–2, 7–5	(Republic of Ireland) Barry King (United States) Ashwin Kumar	(United Kingdom) David Rice (United Kingdom) Daniel Evans	(Lithuania) Laurynas Grigelis (India) Vishnu Vardhan (United Kingdom) Josh Goodall (India) Divij Sharan
June 28	Japan F8 Futures; Sapporo, Japan; Clay $10,000	(Japan) Hiroki Moriya; 6–1, 6–3	(Chinese Taipei) Lee Hsin-han	(Japan) Ryota Hisamatsu (Japan) Hiroki Kondo	(Japan) Yuichi Ito (Japan) Bumpei Sato (Japan) Takuto Niki (Japan) Hiromasa Oku
June 28	Japan F8 Futures; Sapporo, Japan; Clay $10,000	(Chinese Taipei) Lee Hsin-han (Japan) Bumpei Sato; 3–6, 6–4, [15–13]	(Japan) Tasuku Iwami (Japan) Hiroki Kondo	(Japan) Ryota Hisamatsu (Japan) Hiroki Kondo	(Japan) Yuichi Ito (Japan) Bumpei Sato (Japan) Takuto Niki (Japan) Hiromasa Oku
June 28	Morocco F5 Futures; Khemisset, Morocco; Clay $10,000	(France) Augustin Gensse; 6–1, 6–2	(Spain) Carlos Boluda-Purkiss	(Belgium) Julien Dubail (France) Tak Khunn Wang	(Russia) Ivan Nedelko (Morocco) Younès Rachidi (Morocco) Talal Ouahabi (Egypt) Karim Maamoun
June 28	Morocco F5 Futures; Khemisset, Morocco; Clay $10,000	(Morocco) Mohammed Benhammou (Morocco) Anas Fattar; 7–5, 6–7^{(4–7)}, [10–7]	(Belgium) Marco Dierckx (Belgium) Bart Govaerts	(Belgium) Julien Dubail (France) Tak Khunn Wang	(Russia) Ivan Nedelko (Morocco) Younès Rachidi (Morocco) Talal Ouahabi (Egypt) Karim Maamoun
June 28	Romania F5 Futures; Mediaș, Romania; Clay $10,000	(Romania) Victor-Mugurel Anagnastopol; 6–3, 6–7^{(6–8)}, 6–1	(Italy) Federico Torresi	(Czech Republic) Jiří Školoudík (Italy) Giulio Torroni	(Romania) Marcel-Ioan Miron (Romania) Costin Pavăl (Spain) Carlos Calderón-Rodríguez (Romania) Robert Coman
June 28	Romania F5 Futures; Mediaș, Romania; Clay $10,000	(Romania) Adrian Cruciat (Romania) Victor Ioniță; 7–5, 6–3	(Spain) Carlos Calderón-Rodríguez (Spain) Javier Martí	(Czech Republic) Jiří Školoudík (Italy) Giulio Torroni	(Romania) Marcel-Ioan Miron (Romania) Costin Pavăl (Spain) Carlos Calderón-Rodríguez (Romania) Robert Coman
June 28	Serbia F3 Futures; Belgrade, Serbia; Clay $10,000	(Bosnia and Herzegovina) Aldin Šetkić; 6–3, 3–6, 6–3	(Serbia) Vladimir Obradović	(Croatia) Mislav Hižak (Bulgaria) Tihomir Grozdanov	(Austria) Michael Linzer (Serbia) Miljan Zekić (Serbia) David Savić (Serbia) Ivan Bjelica
June 28	Serbia F3 Futures; Belgrade, Serbia; Clay $10,000	(Hungary) György Balázs (Serbia) David Savić; 6–1, 6–1	(Serbia) Ivan Bjelica (Serbia) Miljan Zekić	(Croatia) Mislav Hižak (Bulgaria) Tihomir Grozdanov	(Austria) Michael Linzer (Serbia) Miljan Zekić (Serbia) David Savić (Serbia) Ivan Bjelica
June 28	USA F16 Futures; Rochester, United States; Clay $10,000	(South Korea) Daniel Yoo; 6–3, 6–4	(United States) Jarmere Jenkins	(United States) Greg Ouellette (United States) Chase Buchanan	(Russia) Artem Ilyushin (United States) Steve Johnson (United States) Denis Zivkovic (United States) Marcus Fugate
June 28	USA F16 Futures; Rochester, United States; Clay $10,000	(United States) Cory Parr (United States) Connor Pollock; 6–3, 6–4	(United States) Chase Buchanan (United States) Bryan Koniecko	(United States) Greg Ouellette (United States) Chase Buchanan	(Russia) Artem Ilyushin (United States) Steve Johnson (United States) Denis Zivkovic (United States) Marcus Fugate
