= Alexander Slabinsky =

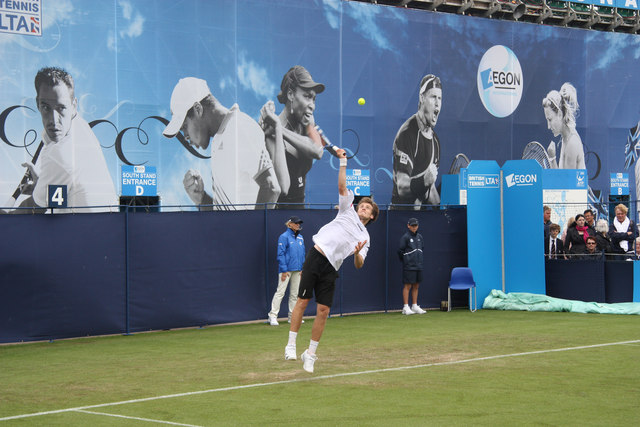
- Country (sports): United Kingdom
- Born: 6 March 1986 (age 40) Ivano-Frankivsk, Ukrainian SSR, Soviet Union
- Height: 1.85 m (6 ft 1 in)
- Turned pro: 2007
- Retired: March 2014 (last match 2013)
- Plays: Right-handed
- Prize money: $195,456

Singles
- Career record: 0–2
- Career titles: 0
- Highest ranking: 266 (20 October 2008)

Grand Slam singles results
- Australian Open: Q1 (2009)
- Wimbledon: Q2 (2009)
- US Open: Q1 (2008)

Doubles
- Career record: 1–2
- Career titles: 0
- Highest ranking: 276 (17 May 2010)

Grand Slam doubles results
- Wimbledon: 2R (2009)

Alexander Slabinsky (born 6 March 1986) is a former professional tennis player who played under the flag of Great Britain. Slabinsky's career high ATP singles ranking was No. 266 (October 2008) and highest doubles ranking is No. 276 (May 2010), and has previously been ranked as the British Men's No.4 in 2008 and 2009.

Slabinsky played predominantly on the "Futures" and "Challengers" circuits. His favourite courts were hard and clay courts, but he did just as well on grass as he produced good form at both Wimbledon Championships and Queens ATP. He has a very strong serve, and gets a large number of aces in matches. His serve is backed up by good ground strokes and he is solid from both sides. His usual doubles partner is Chris Eaton, another Brit. Alex trains at Roehampton NTC as part of the British Team together with Andy Murray, Alex Bogdanovic and James Ward.

== Early life ==
Alex is originally from Ukraine, but moved to Britain with his family at the age of 10 to London. Alex started playing tennis in Ukraine at the age of 8. In the UK Globe LTC showed support for young Alex and gave him a complimentary membership at the club and a few hours with a professional coach, he is now a life member.

At 16 Slabinsky had knee surgery which took him out of tennis for over a year. When he recovered Sutton Tennis Academy let him train at the centre. Alex has played for the Sutton squad in every age group. His overall ambition, like most, was to play on the ATP tour regularly and reach the top 10.

== Career ==
=== 2007 ===
Slabinsky played on the Futures tour for the most part of the year. Alex was given a wildcard into the main draw of the Shrewsbury Challenger, and took advantage of it. He beat Ladislav Chramosta 6–1, 6–3 before upsetting Richard Bloomfield 7–6^{(7–5)}, 7–6^{(7–5)}. He was stopped in his tracks in the quarter-finals by Frenchman David Guez 4–6, 4–6. In late December Alex won in the Nigeria F4 futures tournament, beating Cătălin Gârd 6–4, 6–3. Later that month he received the ITF World Player of the Month Award for his achievements in Africa. This was his second tournament win in his career, first coming in 2006 where he won a Satellite Event in Wrexham, UK.

=== 2008 ===
Alex made good progress being solid on both futures and challengers reaching the quarter-finals in most tournaments. Slabinsky made his ATP tour debut on 16 June 2008 when he played at the 2008 Nottingham Open against experienced American Vince Spadea but was beaten in straight sets 6–1, 7–5. Alex then played Queens ATP qualifying event where he defeated world number 59 Gilles Müller 7–6, 7–6, and only narrowly lost to world number 77 Danai Udomchoke 63 46 36. He was later awarded entry into the men's doubles tournament at the 2008 Wimbledon Championships, partnering Chris Eaton they were defeated in 1st round of the championships by the world number 1 pair Bob and Mike Bryan 5–7, 2–6, 4–6. Slabinsky reached the final of Sweden F2 Futures tournament before losing to Michael Ryderstedt 1–6, 4–6. Slabinsky suffered a lacklustre season after that as he moved up onto the more difficult Challenger Circuits and failed to win a single title, but still managed to increase his ranking by 68 places.

=== 2009 ===
At the start of the year Alex played in the Singles qualifying for the $75,000+H Challenger tournament held in Nouméa, New Caledonia. He qualified for the main draw by beating Mathieu Meyzen (6–0, 6–1), Matteo Marrai (6–4, 6–4), and Alexander Flock (6–3, 6–4). In the main draw, Alex overcame world number 211 Scoville Jenkins 5–7, 6–2, 6–4 to set up a match against compatriot Alex Bogdanovic in the second round. Despite losing 3–6, 5–7, Slabinsky's rank increased to 331 the subsequent week, nine places from the entry list cut off for the Australian Open qualifying tournament. Following a number of withdrawals Slabinsky was able to enter the Australian Open qualifying event. He lost in the first round of qualifying to Alexander Kudryavtsev 4–6, 0–6.

Slabinsky later participated at the Davis Cup playoffs for the tie against Ukraine. He missed out on a place in the team after losing a 5 set match to Joshua Goodall, who later played as the British Number 1 singles player following the withdrawal of Andy Murray.

In June, Slabinsky was awarded a wildcard into the qualifying events of both the singles and men's doubles events at the 2009 Wimbledon Championships. Slabinsky recorded his first singles win in a Grand Slam qualifying tournament by beating Adrian Cruciat of Romania 6–4, 6–3, before losing to Croatian Roko Karanušić in round two. However, when partnering Chris Eaton, the pair managed to qualify for the main draw of the men's doubles tournament, and later won in the first round defeating the Top 50 pair of Santiago Ventura and Marcel Granollers, 6–3, 6–4, 6–2. Slabinsky and Eaton later fell to the experienced Czech team of Leoš Friedl and David Škoch in the 2nd round.

Slabinsky suffered a knee injury during the post-Wimbledon grass season. He underwent surgery which kept him out of the tour for three months, before returning to competitive tennis at the $15k Futures tournament held in Glasgow in October 2009. In his first match back, Slabinsky recorded a good win over fellow Brit Matthew Illingworth, winning 7–6, 7–6. However, Alex was on the receiving end of a 6–1, 6–1 defeat by Italian seed Claudio Grassi in the second round. At the $15k Cardiff Futures tournament, held a week later, Slabinsky was drawn against No.2 seed Uladzimir Ignatik of Belarus in the first round. Following a 1–6, 2–6 defeat by Ignatik, Slabinsky focused on the doubles event, where he reached the final with partner Tim Bradshaw, finishing runner-up to the Irish pair of Barry King and James McGee following a 4–6, 6–7^{(3)} loss.

In November, Slabinsky was seeded fourth in the $15k El Salvador Futures tournament held in Santa Tecla. Slabinsky eased through his first two rounds before losing to Slovenian Borut Puc (5–7, 6–3, 6–2) in the quarter-finals. Slabinsky failed to get past the second round in the singles at his next three tournaments, the Dominican Republic Futures series, losing to American Adam El Mihdawy twice and Belgian Yannick Vandenbulcke once. Slabinsky partnered with Israeli Amir Weintraub in the doubles at the second Dominican Republic Futures tournament and finished runner-up to Adam El Midhawy and partner Blake Strode losing 3–6, 6–2, 7–10 in the final. Although Slabinsky was knocked out of the second round in the singles tournament at the $15k Brazil Futures held in Sorocaba, he did finish runner-up with Spaniard Guillermo Alcaide in doubles.

=== 2011 ===
At the 2011 Aegon International ATP Tour event, Alex qualified for the main draw by beating fellow Brits James Feaver (7–6^{(3)}, 6–1) and Sean Thornley (7–6^{(5)}, 6–3), followed by Russian Denis Matsukevich (6–1, 6–2, 7–6^{(4)}), eventually narrowly losing to world top 20 ATP player Kevin Anderson (7–5, 6–4) in the Main Draw. His achievements were rewarded by the Aegon British Player of the Month Award.

=== 2014 ===
Together with Simon Konov a fellow player and international coach founded Top Tennis Training (http://www.top-tennis-training.com) the fastest growing tennis instruction website in the world. Their YouTube Channel https://www.youtube.com/user/TopTennisTrainingNet has over 20million views and over 50,000 subscribers online. Their tennis tutorials specialise in helping their students with tennis technique, tennis tactics and tennis fitness as well as providing mental training tips for tennis. Alex teamed up with David Ferrer and filmed a video mini-series breaking down David Ferrer Tennis Tactics and how to win a tennis match.

=== 2015 ===
Alex was part of the Roger Federer training team during the ATP World Tour Finals in London where Roger went on to reach the final. Alex then went on to team up with former World Number 3 and ATP World Tour Finals Champion David Nalbandian to film an insight into David Nalbandian Return – how to return in tennis and David Nalbandian Backhand – how to hit a backhand in tennis where David broke down the fundamentals for tennis players worldwide.

== Singles finals ==
Legend (singles)
ATP Challenger Tour (0)
ITF Futures (5)

No.	Date	Tournament	Surface	Opponent in the final	Score
1.	8 November 2005	Wrexham Satellite 05	Hard	(Ukraine) Sergei Bubka	7–6, 2–6, 6–4
2.	17 December 2007	Nigeria F4	Hard	(Romania) Cătălin Gârd	6–4, 6–3
3.	8 May 2010	Edinburgh, Great Britain F6	Clay	(France) Mathieu Rodrigues	7–6^{(7–4)}, 7–5
4.	21 July 2012	Felixstowe, Great Britain F11	Grass	(United Kingdom) Tom Burn	7–5, 5–7, 6–4
5.	26 August 2012	Enschede, Netherlands F5	Clay	(United Kingdom) Oliver Golding	6–7^{(5–7)}, 6–3, 6–4

Runner-up

No.	Date	Tournament	Surface	Opponent in the final	Score
1.	18 June 2007	Ireland F1	Carpet	(Australia) Colin Ebelthite	2–6, 3–6
2.	27 August 2007	Great Britain F16	Hard	(Japan) Satoshi Iwabuchi	3–6, 2–6
3.	22 September 2008	Sweden F2	Hard	(Sweden) Michael Ryderstedt	1–6, 4–6
4.	29 August 2010	Poznań, Poland F6	Clay	(Poland) Marcin Gawron	3–6, 4–6
5.	20 October 2012	Annaba, Algeria F2	Clay	(Canada) Steven Diez	6–4, 4–6, 1–6

== Doubles finals ==
No.	Date	Tournament	Surface	Partner	Opponent in the final	Score
1.	5 June 2006	Italy F7	Clay	(Greece) Konstantinos Oliver Kalaitzis	(Italy) Simone Appio (Italy) Mauro Commisso	6–3, 6–4
2.	10 December 2007	Nigeria F3	Hard	(India) Navdeep Singh	(Israel) Idan Mark (Israel) Amir Weintraub	7–6^{(2)}, 3–6, [10–7]
3.	14 January 2011	Glasgow, Great Britain F1	Hard	(United Kingdom) Chris Eaton	(Finland) Harri Heliövaara (Finland) Juho Paukku	6–7^{(3)}, 6–1, [10–2]
4.	5 May 2013	Balaguer, Spain F12	Clay	(Spain) Ferran Ventura-Martell	(Denmark) Jesper Korsbaek Jensen (Portugal) Goncalo Oliveira	3–6, 6–3, [11–9]

Runner-up

No.	Date	Tournament	Surface	Partner	Opponents in the final	Score
1.	20 March 2006	Australia F4	Clay	(Australia) Robert Haybittel	(Argentina) Damián Patriarca (Australia) Joseph Sirianni	6–7^{(4)}, 1–6
2.	7 April 2008	Russia F1	Hard	(United Kingdom) Chris Eaton	(Russia) Sergei Demekhine (Russia) Konstantin Kravchuk	1–6, 2–6
3.	30 October 2009	Cardiff, Great Britain F16	Hard	(United Kingdom) Tim Bradshaw	(Republic of Ireland) Barry King (Republic of Ireland) James McGee	4–6, 6–7^{(3)}
4.	4 December 2009	Santo Domingo, Dominican Republic F2	Hard	(Israel) Amir Weintraub	(United States) Adam El Mihdawy (United States) Blake Strode	3–6, 6–2, [7–10]
5.	26 December 2009	Sorocaba, Brazil F32	Clay	(Spain) Guillermo Alcaide	(Brazil) Alexandre Bonatto (Brazil) Rodrigo-Antonio Grilli	2–6, 4–6
6.	3 January 2010	São Paulo, Brazil F34	Hard	(Spain) Guillermo Alcaide	(Argentina) Juan-Pablo Amado (Brazil) Rodrigo-Antonio Grilli	4–6, 5–7
7.	19 March 2010	Astana, Kazakhstan F1	Hard	(Austria) Alexander Peya	(Russia) Evgeny Kirillov (Russia) Alexander Kudryavtsev	3–6, 4–6
8.	10 September 2010	Cumberland, London, Great Britain F13	Hard	(Italy) Claudio Grassi	(United Kingdom) David Rice (United Kingdom) Sean Thornley	6–2, 3–6, [0–10]
9.	29 January 2011	Kaarst, Germany F3	Carpet	(United Kingdom) Chris Eaton	(Germany) Kevin Krawietz (Germany) Marcel Zimmermann	3–6, 5–7
10.	29 April 2011	Bournemouth, Great Britain F5	Clay	(Spain) Carlos Poch-Gradin	(United Kingdom) David Rice (United Kingdom) Sean Thornley	3–6, 4–6
11.	15 April 2012	Antalya, Turkey F14	Hard	(Germany) Gero Kretschmer	(Germany) Richard Becker (Austria) Nikolaus Moser	4–6, 1–6
