= Barry King (tennis) =

Irish tennis player

- Country (sports): Ireland
- Born: 22 January 1985 (age 41)
- Plays: Right-handed
- Prize money: $21,058

Singles
- Career record: 2–2
- Highest ranking: No. 600 (23 November 2009)

Doubles
- Career record: 1–1
- Highest ranking: No. 431 (12 July 2010)

Barry King (born 22 January 1985) is a former professional tennis player and Davis Cup player from Ireland. He was the Irish National Junior Champion before attending the University of Notre Dame on a tennis scholarship.

King played six Davis Cup rubber matches for Ireland in 2010 and 2011. He had a 2/2 record in singles and 1/1 record in doubles. In his last Davis Cup match, he won the deciding singles match to clinch a 3–2 win over Tunisia. In his last professional tournament, he reached the semi-finals of the Irish Open Futures event. He retired in July 2011 to pursue a career in finance.
