= 2011 ITF Men's Circuit (October–December) =

The 2011 ITF Men's Circuit was the 2011 edition of the third-tier tour for men's professional tennis. It was organised by the International Tennis Federation and was a tier below the ATP Challenger Tour. During the months of October and December were played 91 tournaments, with the majority being played in the month of October.

== Key ==
$15,000 tournaments
$10,000 tournaments

== October ==
| Week of | Tournament | Winner | Runners-up | Semifinalists | Quarterfinalists |
|---|---|---|---|---|---|
| October 3 | Algeria F3 Futures; Alger, Algeria; Clay $15,000 | (France) Guillaume Rufin; 7–6^{(7–2)}, 6–4 | (Spain) Guillermo Olaso | (Netherlands) Boy Westerhof (Czech Republic) Roman Vögeli | (Morocco) Anas Fattar (Netherlands) Mark Vervoort (Morocco) Reda Karakhi (Austria) Lukas Jastraunig |
| October 3 | Algeria F3 Futures; Alger, Algeria; Clay $15,000 | (Austria) Lukas Jastraunig (Netherlands) Mark Vervoort; 6–0, 7–6^{(7–3)} | (Dominican Republic) Michael-Ray Pallares González (United States) Murphey Parker | (Netherlands) Boy Westerhof (Czech Republic) Roman Vögeli | (Morocco) Anas Fattar (Netherlands) Mark Vervoort (Morocco) Reda Karakhi (Austria) Lukas Jastraunig |
| October 3 | Argentina F18 Futures; San Juan, Argentina; Clay $10,000 | (Argentina) Pablo Galdón; 6–1, 6–3 | (United States) Andrea Collarini | (Argentina) Kevin Konfederak (Argentina) Juan-Pablo Villar | (Argentina) Renzo Olivo (Argentina) Patricio Heras (Ecuador) Roberto Quiroz (Argentina) Federico Coria |
| October 3 | Argentina F18 Futures; San Juan, Argentina; Clay $10,000 | (Italy) Giorgio Portaluri (Argentina) Juan-Pablo Villar; 6–4, 7–5 | (Argentina) Renzo Olivo (Argentina) Juan-Manuel Romanazzi | (Argentina) Kevin Konfederak (Argentina) Juan-Pablo Villar | (Argentina) Renzo Olivo (Argentina) Patricio Heras (Ecuador) Roberto Quiroz (Argentina) Federico Coria |
| October 3 | Australia F8 Futures; Esperance, Australia; Hard $15,000 | (Australia) Benjamin Mitchell; 6–1, 6–4 | (Australia) Matt Reid | (Australia) Brydan Klein (Australia) Isaac Frost | (New Zealand) Jose Rubin Statham (Australia) Matthew Barton (Australia) Michael Look (Japan) Kento Takeuchi |
| October 3 | Australia F8 Futures; Esperance, Australia; Hard $15,000 | (Australia) Brydan Klein (New Zealand) Jose Rubin Statham; 7–5, 6–3 | (China) Gao Peng (China) Gao Wan | (Australia) Brydan Klein (Australia) Isaac Frost | (New Zealand) Jose Rubin Statham (Australia) Matthew Barton (Australia) Michael Look (Japan) Kento Takeuchi |
| October 3 | Bolivia F3 Futures; Santa Cruz, Bolivia; Clay $10,000 | (Spain) Enrique López Pérez; 6–1, 6–4 | (Peru) Sergio Galdós | (Argentina) Sebastián Decoud (Brazil) Thales Turini | (Russia) Petr Arkhipov (Argentina) Guillermo Carry (Argentina) Juan-Manuel Valverde (Argentina) Gabriel Alejandro Hidalgo |
| October 3 | Bolivia F3 Futures; Santa Cruz, Bolivia; Clay $10,000 | (Peru) Sergio Galdós (Argentina) Guido Pella; 3–6, 6–2, [10–8] | (Brazil) Felipe Soares (Brazil) Thales Turini | (Argentina) Sebastián Decoud (Brazil) Thales Turini | (Russia) Petr Arkhipov (Argentina) Guillermo Carry (Argentina) Juan-Manuel Valverde (Argentina) Gabriel Alejandro Hidalgo |
| October 3 | Brazil F33 Futures; São Paulo, Brazil; Clay $15,000 | (Brazil) Júlio Silva; 7–5, 7–5 | (Portugal) Gastão Elias | (Brazil) Rafael Camilo (Brazil) Caio Zampieri | (Brazil) Eládio Ribeiro Neto (Brazil) Thiago Alves (Brazil) Thiago Monteiro (Brazil) Tiago Lopes |
| October 3 | Brazil F33 Futures; São Paulo, Brazil; Clay $15,000 | (Brazil) Marcelo Demoliner (Brazil) Fernando Romboli; 6–1, 4–6, [10–4] | (Brazil) Daniel Dutra da Silva (Brazil) Caio Zampieri | (Brazil) Rafael Camilo (Brazil) Caio Zampieri | (Brazil) Eládio Ribeiro Neto (Brazil) Thiago Alves (Brazil) Thiago Monteiro (Brazil) Tiago Lopes |
| October 3 | Chile F7 Futures; Santiago, Chile; Clay $10,000 | (Chile) Guillermo Hormazábal; 7–5, 6–2 | (France) Laurent Recouderc | (Peru) Iván Miranda (Chile) Hans Podlipnik Castillo | (Chile) Cristóbal Saavedra Corválan (Ecuador) Juan Sebastián Vivanco (Argentina) Gastón-Arturo Grimolizzi (Australia) Jason Kubler |
| October 3 | Chile F7 Futures; Santiago, Chile; Clay $10,000 | (Chile) Rodrigo Pérez (Ecuador) Juan Sebastián Vivanco; 6–0, 6–4 | (Chile) Javier Muñoz (Chile) Alex Theiler | (Peru) Iván Miranda (Chile) Hans Podlipnik Castillo | (Chile) Cristóbal Saavedra Corválan (Ecuador) Juan Sebastián Vivanco (Argentina) Gastón-Arturo Grimolizzi (Australia) Jason Kubler |
| October 3 | France F17 Futures; Nevers, France; Hard (indoor) $15,000+H | (Czech Republic) Jan Mertl; 3–6, 6–3, 6–4 | (France) Alexandre Sidorenko | (Hungary) Márton Fucsovics (France) Mathieu Rodrigues | (France) David Guez (France) Ludovic Walter (France) Laurent Rochette (France) Jonathan Eysseric |
| October 3 | France F17 Futures; Nevers, France; Hard (indoor) $15,000+H | (France) Kevin Botti (France) Laurent Rochette; 7–6^{(7–3)}, 6–4 | (Republic of Ireland) James Cluskey (France) Alexandre Sidorenko | (Hungary) Márton Fucsovics (France) Mathieu Rodrigues | (France) David Guez (France) Ludovic Walter (France) Laurent Rochette (France) Jonathan Eysseric |
| October 3 | Germany F16 Futures; Leimen, Germany; Hard (indoor) $10,000 | (Germany) Tim Pütz; 6–3, 6–3 | (France) Pierre-Hugues Herbert | (United Kingdom) Joshua Milton (Belgium) Yannik Reuter | (France) Dorian Descloix (Germany) Nils Langer (Germany) Jonas König (Netherlands) Antal van der Duim |
| October 3 | Germany F16 Futures; Leimen, Germany; Hard (indoor) $10,000 | (Romania) Victor Anagnastopol (Romania) Florin Mergea; 7–6^{(7–3)}, 6–2 | (Ivory Coast) Terence Nugent (Germany) Tim Pütz | (United Kingdom) Joshua Milton (Belgium) Yannik Reuter | (France) Dorian Descloix (Germany) Nils Langer (Germany) Jonas König (Netherlands) Antal van der Duim |
| October 3 | Indonesia F5 Futures; Palembang, Indonesia; Hard $15,000 | (Japan) Hiroki Kondo; 7–5, 6–4 | (Thailand) Danai Udomchoke | (South Korea) Cho Soong-jae (India) Karan Rastogi | (Japan) Junn Mitsuhashi (India) Karunuday Singh (Indonesia) Elbert Sie (India) Vishnu Vardhan |
| October 3 | Indonesia F5 Futures; Palembang, Indonesia; Hard $15,000 | (Thailand) Danai Udomchoke (Chinese Taipei) Jimmy Wang; 6–0, 6–1 | (Finland) Harri Heliövaara (Japan) Hiroki Kondo | (South Korea) Cho Soong-jae (India) Karan Rastogi | (Japan) Junn Mitsuhashi (India) Karunuday Singh (Indonesia) Elbert Sie (India) Vishnu Vardhan |
| October 3 | Italy F30 Futures; Naples, Italy; Carpet $10,000 | (Italy) Marco Crugnola; 7–6^{(7–4)}, 6–2 | (Italy) Enrico Iannuzzi | (Italy) Alessandro Bega (Italy) Riccardo Sinicropi | (Italy) Edoardo Eremin (Italy) Salvatore Caruso (Italy) Riccardo Bellotti (Germany) Daniel Uhlig |
| October 3 | Italy F30 Futures; Naples, Italy; Carpet $10,000 | (Italy) Alessandro Bega (Italy) Riccardo Sinicropi; 7–6^{(7–4)}, 7–6^{(7–4)} | (Italy) Marco Crugnola (Italy) Matteo Volante | (Italy) Alessandro Bega (Italy) Riccardo Sinicropi | (Italy) Edoardo Eremin (Italy) Salvatore Caruso (Italy) Riccardo Bellotti (Germany) Daniel Uhlig |
| October 3 | Mexico F13 Futures; Monterrey, Mexico; Hard $10,000 | (Guatemala) Christopher Díaz Figueroa; 6–3, 3–6, 6–1 | (United States) Adam El Mihdawy | (Italy) Federico Gaio (Barbados) Haydn Lewis | (Mexico) Manuel Sánchez (Mexico) Miguel Gallardo-Vallés (Mexico) Daniel Garza (Italy) Claudio Grassi |
| October 3 | Mexico F13 Futures; Monterrey, Mexico; Hard $10,000 | (United States) Adam El Mihdawy (Australia) Nima Roshan; 6–2, 7–6^{(7–2)} | (Mexico) Miguel Gallardo-Vallés (Italy) Claudio Grassi | (Italy) Federico Gaio (Barbados) Haydn Lewis | (Mexico) Manuel Sánchez (Mexico) Miguel Gallardo-Vallés (Mexico) Daniel Garza (Italy) Claudio Grassi |
| October 3 | Spain F36 Futures; Córdoba, Spain; Hard $15,000 | (Spain) Iván Navarro; 6–7^{(4–7)}, 6–4, 7–6^{(8–6)} | (Spain) Adrián Menéndez | (Republic of Ireland) James McGee (Portugal) João Sousa | (United Kingdom) Andrew Fitzpatrick (Spain) Iván Arenas-Gualda (Canada) Steven Diez (United Kingdom) Morgan Phillips |
| October 3 | Spain F36 Futures; Córdoba, Spain; Hard $15,000 | (Spain) Miguel Ángel López Jaén (Spain) Gabriel Trujillo Soler; 6–4, 6–4 | (Spain) Gerard Granollers (Portugal) João Sousa | (Republic of Ireland) James McGee (Portugal) João Sousa | (United Kingdom) Andrew Fitzpatrick (Spain) Iván Arenas-Gualda (Canada) Steven Diez (United Kingdom) Morgan Phillips |
| October 3 | Sweden F7 Futures; Lidköping, Sweden; Hard (indoor) $10,000 | (United Kingdom) Daniel Smethurst; 3–6, 6–3, 7–6^{(7–5)} | (Sweden) Carl Bergman | (France) Yannick Jankovits (Finland) Timo Nieminen | (Sweden) Tobias Blömgren (Sweden) Daniel Berta (Sweden) Pablo Figueroa (Sweden) Markus Eriksson |
| October 3 | Sweden F7 Futures; Lidköping, Sweden; Hard (indoor) $10,000 | (Sweden) Carl Bergman (Sweden) Patrik Rosenholm; 6–4, 4–6, [10–5] | (Sweden) Jesper Brunström (Sweden) Markus Eriksson | (France) Yannick Jankovits (Finland) Timo Nieminen | (Sweden) Tobias Blömgren (Sweden) Daniel Berta (Sweden) Pablo Figueroa (Sweden) Markus Eriksson |
| October 3 | Turkey F26 Futures; Antalya, Turkey; Hard $10,000 | (Austria) Philipp Oswald; 6–4, 6–1 | (Czech Republic) Michal Konečný | (Russia) Ivan Nedelko (Egypt) Mohamed Safwat | (Canada) Érik Chvojka (United Kingdom) Sean Thornley (Austria) Maximilian Neuchrist (Russia) Mikhail Biryukov |
| October 3 | Turkey F26 Futures; Antalya, Turkey; Hard $10,000 | (United Kingdom) David Rice (United Kingdom) Sean Thornley; 7–6^{(11–9)}, 6–3 | (Canada) Érik Chvojka (Czech Republic) Michal Konečný | (Russia) Ivan Nedelko (Egypt) Mohamed Safwat | (Canada) Érik Chvojka (United Kingdom) Sean Thornley (Austria) Maximilian Neuchrist (Russia) Mikhail Biryukov |
| October 3 | Venezuela F8 Futures; Caracas, Venezuela; Hard $15,000 | (Canada) Peter Polansky; 6–1, 6–3 | (Colombia) Eduardo Struvay | (Venezuela) Román Recarte (Ecuador) Julio César Campozano | (Colombia) Juan Sebastián Gómez (Colombia) Nicolás Barrientos (Peru) Mauricio Echazú (Venezuela) Piero Luisi |
| October 3 | Venezuela F8 Futures; Caracas, Venezuela; Hard $15,000 | (United States) Maciek Sykut (United States) Denis Zivkovic; 6–4, 7–5 | (Venezuela) Piero Luisi (Venezuela) Román Recarte | (Venezuela) Román Recarte (Ecuador) Julio César Campozano | (Colombia) Juan Sebastián Gómez (Colombia) Nicolás Barrientos (Peru) Mauricio Echazú (Venezuela) Piero Luisi |
| October 10 | Argentina F19 Futures; Kalgoorlie, Argentina; Clay $10,000 | (Argentina) Kevin Konfederak; 7–6^{(7–4)}, 6–4 | (Argentina) Alejandro Fabbri | (Argentina) Juan-Martín Aranguren (Argentina) Martín Alund | (Argentina) Juan-Manuel Ramanazzi (United States) Andrea Collarini (Argentina) Juan-Pablo Villar (Argentina) Renzo Olivo |
| October 10 | Argentina F19 Futures; Kalgoorlie, Argentina; Clay $10,000 | (Argentina) Alejandro Fabbri (Argentina) Jonathan Gonzalia; 6–3, 6–0 | (Argentina) Martín Alund (Argentina) Renzo Olivo | (Argentina) Juan-Martín Aranguren (Argentina) Martín Alund | (Argentina) Juan-Manuel Ramanazzi (United States) Andrea Collarini (Argentina) Juan-Pablo Villar (Argentina) Renzo Olivo |
| October 10 | Australia F9 Futures; Kalgoorlie, Australia; Hard $15,000 | (Australia) Brydan Klein; 7–5, 6–3 | (Australia) Benjamin Mitchell | (Japan) Hiroki Moriya (Australia) Matt Reid | (Australia) Matthew Barton (United Kingdom) Richard Gabb (Australia) Andrew Whittington (Australia) Zach Itzstein |
| October 10 | Australia F9 Futures; Kalgoorlie, Australia; Hard $15,000 | (Australia) Michael Look (United States) Nicolas Meister; 2–6, 7–6^{(8–6)}, [10–5] | (Australia) Brydan Klein (New Zealand) Jose Rubin Statham | (Japan) Hiroki Moriya (Australia) Matt Reid | (Australia) Matthew Barton (United Kingdom) Richard Gabb (Australia) Andrew Whittington (Australia) Zach Itzstein |
| October 10 | Bolivia F4 Futures; Sucre, Bolivia; Clay $10,000 | (Argentina) Facundo Mena; 4–6, 6–3, 6–4 | (Argentina) Juan Ignacio Amarante | (Bolivia) Mauricio Estívariz (Argentina) Guillermo Carry | (Argentina) Gabriel Alejandro Hidalgo (Argentina) Joaquín-Jesús Monteferrario (Bolivia) Federico Zeballos (Bolivia) Hugo Dellien |
| October 10 | Bolivia F4 Futures; Sucre, Bolivia; Clay $10,000 | (Argentina) Guillermo Carry (Argentina) Joaquín-Jésus Monteferrario; 7–6^{(7–3)}, 6–4 | (Peru) Sergio Galdós (Argentina) Guido Pella | (Bolivia) Mauricio Estívariz (Argentina) Guillermo Carry | (Argentina) Gabriel Alejandro Hidalgo (Argentina) Joaquín-Jesús Monteferrario (Bolivia) Federico Zeballos (Bolivia) Hugo Dellien |
| October 10 | Brazil F34 Futures; Fernandópolis, Brazil; Clay $10,000 | (Brazil) Thiago Alves; 6–2, 6–1 | (Brazil) Fernando Romboli | (Brazil) André Miele (Brazil) Nicolas Santos | (Brazil) Fabrício Neis (Brazil) Fabiano de Paula (Brazil) Daniel Dutra da Silva (Sweden) Christian Lindell |
| October 10 | Brazil F34 Futures; Fernandópolis, Brazil; Clay $10,000 | (Brazil) Raony Carvalho (Brazil) Fabrício Neis; 6–2, 7–6^{(7–5)} | (Ecuador) Diego Hidalgo (Brazil) Wilson Leite | (Brazil) André Miele (Brazil) Nicolas Santos | (Brazil) Fabrício Neis (Brazil) Fabiano de Paula (Brazil) Daniel Dutra da Silva (Sweden) Christian Lindell |
| October 10 | Chile F8 Futures; Rancagua, Chile; Clay $10,000 | (Chile) Guillermo Hormazábal; 6–2, 6–1 | (Chile) Hans Podlipnik Castillo | (Chile) Cristóbal Saavedra Corvalán (Chile) Matías Sborowitz | (Australia) Jason Kubler (Chile) Gonzalo Lama (Chile) Carlos González-Leiva (France) Laurent Recouderc |
| October 10 | Chile F8 Futures; Rancagua, Chile; Clay $10,000 | (Chile) Guillermo Hormazábal (Chile) Cristóbal Saavedra Corválan; 6–2, 7–6^{(7–5)} | (Chile) Hans Podlipnik Castillo (Chile) Ricardo Urzúa-Rivera | (Chile) Cristóbal Saavedra Corvalán (Chile) Matías Sborowitz | (Australia) Jason Kubler (Chile) Gonzalo Lama (Chile) Carlos González-Leiva (France) Laurent Recouderc |
| October 10 | Croatia F12 Futures; Solin, Croatia; Clay $15,000 | (Netherlands) Nick van der Meer; 3–6, 6–4, 6–2 | (Slovenia) Aljaž Bedene | (Slovakia) Andrej Martin (Hungary) Attila Balázs | (Spain) Javier Martí (Slovenia) Janez Semrajc (Czech Republic) Dušan Lojda (Croatia) Joško Topić |
| October 10 | Croatia F12 Futures; Solin, Croatia; Clay $15,000 | (Romania) Victor Anagnastopol (Romania) Florin Mergea; 6–4, 7–5 | (Croatia) Marin Draganja (Croatia) Dino Marcan | (Slovakia) Andrej Martin (Hungary) Attila Balázs | (Spain) Javier Martí (Slovenia) Janez Semrajc (Czech Republic) Dušan Lojda (Croatia) Joško Topić |
| October 10 | France F18 Futures; Saint-Dizier, France; Hard (indoor) $15,000 | (Czech Republic) Jan Mertl; 6–3, 4–6, 6–4 | (France) Olivier Patience | (Republic of Ireland) Conor Niland (France) Ludovic Walter | (France) Gleb Sakharov (Belgium) Julien Dubail (France) Alexandre Sidorenko (France) Sébastien Boltz |
| October 10 | France F18 Futures; Saint-Dizier, France; Hard (indoor) $15,000 | (Germany) Holger Fischer (Czech Republic) Jan Mertl; 6–4, 7–5 | (Republic of Ireland) Sam Barry (Republic of Ireland) James Cluskey | (Republic of Ireland) Conor Niland (France) Ludovic Walter | (France) Gleb Sakharov (Belgium) Julien Dubail (France) Alexandre Sidorenko (France) Sébastien Boltz |
| October 10 | Germany F17 Futures; Isernhagen, Germany; Hard (indoor) $10,000 | (Finland) Timo Nieminen; 6–2, 6–4 | (Germany) Peter Torebko | (Germany) Jan-Lennard Struff (Germany) Stefan Seifert | (Finland) Micke Kontinen (United Kingdom) Joshua Milton (Belgium) Niels Desein (Germany) Nils Langer |
| October 10 | Germany F17 Futures; Isernhagen, Germany; Hard (indoor) $10,000 | (Germany) Marko Lenz (Germany) George van Massow; 7–6^{(7–2)}, 6–4 | (Germany) Michel Dornbusch (Germany) Mattis Wetzel | (Germany) Jan-Lennard Struff (Germany) Stefan Seifert | (Finland) Micke Kontinen (United Kingdom) Joshua Milton (Belgium) Niels Desein (Germany) Nils Langer |
| October 10 | Italy F31 Futures; Biella, Italy; Clay $10,000 | (Italy) Andrea Arnaboldi; 6–4, 6–0 | (France) Julien Obry | (Poland) Grzegorz Panfil (Italy) Marco Crugnola | (Italy) Roberto Marcora (France) François-Arthur Vibert (Italy) Marco Cecchinato (France) Jérôme Inzerillo |
| October 10 | Italy F31 Futures; Biella, Italy; Clay $10,000 | (Italy) Fabio Colangelo (Italy) Marco Crugnola; 6–2, 1–6, [10–8] | (Italy) Andrea Arnaboldi (Italy) Walter Trusendi | (Poland) Grzegorz Panfil (Italy) Marco Crugnola | (Italy) Roberto Marcora (France) François-Arthur Vibert (Italy) Marco Cecchinato (France) Jérôme Inzerillo |
| October 10 | Morocco F8 Futures; Tanger, Morocco; Clay $15,000 | (France) Axel Michon; 6–4, 6–0 | (Italy) Matteo Viola | (Italy) Luca Vanni (Czech Republic) Roman Jebavý | (Morocco) Mehdi Ziadi (France) Florian Reynet (Algeria) Lamine Ouahab (United Kingdom) Daniel Cox |
| October 10 | Morocco F8 Futures; Tanger, Morocco; Clay $15,000 | (Italy) Luca Vanni (Italy) Matteo Viola; 6–2, 1–6, [10–8] | (Czech Republic) Roman Jebavý (Czech Republic) Jan Šátral | (Italy) Luca Vanni (Czech Republic) Roman Jebavý | (Morocco) Mehdi Ziadi (France) Florian Reynet (Algeria) Lamine Ouahab (United Kingdom) Daniel Cox |
| October 10 | Spain F37 Futures; Sant Cugat, Spain; Clay $15,000 | (Spain) Gerard Granollers; 6–2, 6–4 | (Spain) Marc Fornell Mestres | (Germany) Marcel Zimmermann (United Kingdom) Morgan Phillips | (Spain) Guillermo Olaso (Spain) Íñigo Cervantes Huegun (Spain) David Estruch (Spain) Gabriel Trujillo Soler |
| October 10 | Spain F37 Futures; Sant Cugat, Spain; Clay $15,000 | (Germany) Kevin Krawietz (Germany) Marcel Zimmermann; 3–6, 7–6^{(7–5)}, [10–4] | (Spain) Marc Fornell Mestres (Spain) Miguel Ángel López Jaén | (Germany) Marcel Zimmermann (United Kingdom) Morgan Phillips | (Spain) Guillermo Olaso (Spain) Íñigo Cervantes Huegun (Spain) David Estruch (Spain) Gabriel Trujillo Soler |
| October 10 | Turkey F27 Futures; Antalya, Turkey; Hard $10,000 | (Czech Republic) Michal Konečný; 6–3, 6–4 | (Canada) Érik Chvojka | (Sweden) Patrik Brydolf (Ukraine) Vladyslav Klymenko | (Austria) Maximilian Neuchrist (Ukraine) Vadim Alekseenko (United Kingdom) Sean Thornley (Czech Republic) Michal Konečný |
| October 10 | Turkey F27 Futures; Antalya, Turkey; Hard $10,000 | The doubles event was cancelled. | | (Sweden) Patrik Brydolf (Ukraine) Vladyslav Klymenko | (Austria) Maximilian Neuchrist (Ukraine) Vadim Alekseenko (United Kingdom) Sean Thornley (Czech Republic) Michal Konečný |
| October 10 | USA F26 Futures; Austin, United States; Clay $15,000 | (Canada) Peter Polansky; 4–6, 7–6^{(7–5)}, 6–4 | (Australia) John-Patrick Smith | (France) Alexandre Lacroix (United States) Adam El Mihdawy | (United Kingdom) Jamie Baker (United Kingdom) Chris Eaton (Australia) Mark Verryth (United States) Nicholas Monroe |
| October 10 | USA F26 Futures; Austin, United States; Clay $15,000 | (United Kingdom) Edward Corrie (United Kingdom) Chris Eaton; 6–2, 7–5 | (Australia) Benjamin Rogers (Australia) John-Patrick Smith | (France) Alexandre Lacroix (United States) Adam El Mihdawy | (United Kingdom) Jamie Baker (United Kingdom) Chris Eaton (Australia) Mark Verryth (United States) Nicholas Monroe |
| October 17 | Argentina F20 Futures; Rafaela, Argentina; Clay $10,000 | (Argentina) Maximiliano Estévez; 7–6^{(7–2)}, 6–1 | (Argentina) Leandro Migani | (Argentina) Martin Rios-Benites (Argentina) Patricio Heras | (Argentina) Juan-Martín Aranguren (Argentina) Renzo Olivo (Argentina) Juan-Manuel Valverde (Argentina) Matías Salinas |
| October 17 | Argentina F20 Futures; Rafaela, Argentina; Clay $10,000 | (Argentina) Patricio Heras (Argentina) Gustavo Sterin; 6–7^{(2–7)}, 6–1, [10–8] | (Italy) Giammarco Micolani (Argentina) Franco Scaravilli | (Argentina) Martin Rios-Benites (Argentina) Patricio Heras | (Argentina) Juan-Martín Aranguren (Argentina) Renzo Olivo (Argentina) Juan-Manuel Valverde (Argentina) Matías Salinas |
| October 17 | Brazil F35 Futures; Lins, Brazil; Clay $10,000 | (Brazil) Fernando Romboli; 6–1, 6–2 | (Brazil) André Miele | (Sweden) Christian Lindell (Brazil) Tiago Lopes | (Brazil) José Pereira (Ecuador) Diego Hidalgo (Brazil) Fabiano de Paula (Brazil) Nicolas Santos |
| October 17 | Brazil F35 Futures; Lins, Brazil; Clay $10,000 | (Brazil) Víctor Maynard (Brazil) Fernando Romboli; 2–6, 6–2, [10–0] | (Ecuador) Diego Hidalgo (Brazil) Riccardo Siggia | (Sweden) Christian Lindell (Brazil) Tiago Lopes | (Brazil) José Pereira (Ecuador) Diego Hidalgo (Brazil) Fabiano de Paula (Brazil) Nicolas Santos |
| October 17 | Chile F9 Futures; Talca, Chile; Clay $10,000 | (Chile) Guillermo Hormazábal; 6–2, 6–0 | (Chile) Cristóbal Saavedra Corvalán | (France) Laurent Recouderc (Chile) Víctor Morales | (Chile) Juan Carlos Sáez (Belgium) Germain Gigounon (Belgium) Arthur De Greef (Chile) Víctor Núñez |
| October 17 | Chile F9 Futures; Talca, Chile; Clay $10,000 | (Belgium) Germain Gigounon (Belgium) Christophe Rochus; 7–5, 6–3 | (Chile) Guillermo Hormazábal (Chile) Cristóbal Saavedra Corvalán | (France) Laurent Recouderc (Chile) Víctor Morales | (Chile) Juan Carlos Sáez (Belgium) Germain Gigounon (Belgium) Arthur De Greef (Chile) Víctor Núñez |
| October 17 | Croatia F13 Futures; Dubrovnik, Croatia; Clay $15,000 | (Spain) Javier Martí; 6–4, 6–2 | (Czech Republic) Dušan Lojda | (France) Olivier Patience (Bosnia and Herzegovina) Tomislav Brkić | (Bosnia and Herzegovina) Damir Džumhur (Austria) Nikolaus Moser (Germany) Ivo Mijic (Serbia) Ivan Bjelica |
| October 17 | Croatia F13 Futures; Dubrovnik, Croatia; Clay $15,000 | (Croatia) Marin Draganja (Croatia) Dino Marcan; 6–1, 6–4 | (Romania) Victor Anagnastopol (Romania) Florin Mergea | (France) Olivier Patience (Bosnia and Herzegovina) Tomislav Brkić | (Bosnia and Herzegovina) Damir Džumhur (Austria) Nikolaus Moser (Germany) Ivo Mijic (Serbia) Ivan Bjelica |
| October 17 | France F19 Futures; La Roche-sur-Yon, France; Hard (indoor) $15,000+H | (Belgium) David Goffin; 6–2, 1–6, 7–6^{(7–4)} | (Germany) Peter Torebko | (France) Josselin Ouanna (France) Rudy Coco | (France) Ludovic Walter (Czech Republic) Jan Mertl (France) Jeremy Blandin (France) Romain Jouan |
| October 17 | France F19 Futures; La Roche-sur-Yon, France; Hard (indoor) $15,000+H | (France) Jérémy Blandin (France) Gleb Sakharov; 7–6^{(7–2)}, 3–6, [10–7] | (South Africa) Jean Andersen (Republic of Ireland) James Cluskey | (France) Josselin Ouanna (France) Rudy Coco | (France) Ludovic Walter (Czech Republic) Jan Mertl (France) Jeremy Blandin (France) Romain Jouan |
| October 17 | Great Britain F16 Futures; Glasgow, Great Britain; Hard (indoor) $15,000 | (United Kingdom) Joshua Goodall; 7–6^{(7–3)}, 7–5 | (Czech Republic) Jan Minář | (United Kingdom) Daniel Cox (United Kingdom) Daniel Evans | (Republic of Ireland) Sam Barry (France) Nicolas Rosenzweig (United Kingdom) Joshua Milton (Poland) Andriej Kapaś |
| October 17 | Great Britain F16 Futures; Glasgow, Great Britain; Hard (indoor) $15,000 | (Italy) Fabio Colangelo (Italy) Marco Crugnola; 6–4, 2–6, [15–13] | (United Kingdom) Daniel Evans (United Kingdom) Andrew Fitzpatrick | (United Kingdom) Daniel Cox (United Kingdom) Daniel Evans | (Republic of Ireland) Sam Barry (France) Nicolas Rosenzweig (United Kingdom) Joshua Milton (Poland) Andriej Kapaś |
| October 17 | Kuwait F1 Futures; Meshref, Kuwait; Hard $10,000 | (Belgium) Julien Dubail; 6–4, 6–2 | (Netherlands) Miliaan Niesten | (Belgium) Alexandre Folie (Switzerland) Henri Laaksonen | (Kuwait) Mohammad Ghareeb (Sweden) Robin Olin (North Macedonia) Danil Zelenkov (France) Mathias Bourgue |
| October 17 | Kuwait F1 Futures; Meshref, Kuwait; Hard $10,000 | (Italy) Claudio Grassi (Russia) Mikhail Vasiliev; 6–4, 4–6, [10–8] | (Germany) Florian Fallert (Germany) Nils Langer | (Belgium) Alexandre Folie (Switzerland) Henri Laaksonen | (Kuwait) Mohammad Ghareeb (Sweden) Robin Olin (North Macedonia) Danil Zelenkov (France) Mathias Bourgue |
| October 17 | Morocco F9 Futures; Fes, Morocco; Clay $15,000 | (France) Julien Obry; 6–1, 7–6^{(9–7)} | (Italy) Enrico Burzi | (Italy) Matteo Marrai (France) Florian Reynet | (Czech Republic) Michal Schmid (Czech Republic) Roman Jebavý (Czech Republic) Jan Šátral (Morocco) Mehdi Ziadi |
| October 17 | Morocco F9 Futures; Fes, Morocco; Clay $15,000 | (Czech Republic) Roman Jebavý (Czech Republic) Jan Šátral; 6–7^{(6–8)}, 7–6^{(7–3)}, [10–7] | (France) Florent Diep (Czech Republic) Michal Schmid | (Italy) Matteo Marrai (France) Florian Reynet | (Czech Republic) Michal Schmid (Czech Republic) Roman Jebavý (Czech Republic) Jan Šátral (Morocco) Mehdi Ziadi |
| October 17 | Nigeria F3 Futures; Lagos, Nigeria; Hard $15,000+H | (India) Yuki Bhambri; 7–5, 7–5 | (South Africa) Ruan Roelofse | (Croatia) Ante Pavić (India) Vijayant Malik | (Slovakia) Kamil Čapkovič (India) Vishnu Vardhan (India) Ranjeet Virali-Murugesan (India) Karan Rastogi |
| October 17 | Nigeria F3 Futures; Lagos, Nigeria; Hard $15,000+H | (India) Yuki Bhambri (India) Ranjeet Virali-Murugesan; 6–2, 7–5 | (India) Karan Rastogi (India) Vishnu Vardhan | (Croatia) Ante Pavić (India) Vijayant Malik | (Slovakia) Kamil Čapkovič (India) Vishnu Vardhan (India) Ranjeet Virali-Murugesan (India) Karan Rastogi |
| October 17 | Spain F38 Futures; Sabadell, Spain; Clay $15,000 | (Portugal) João Sousa; 3–6, 7–6^{(7–4)}, 6–4 | (Germany) Marcel Zimmermann | (Germany) Kevin Krawietz (Japan) Taro Daniel | (Spain) Marc Fornell Mestres (Switzerland) Michael Lammer (Italy) Daniele Giorgini (Spain) Gerard Granollers |
| October 17 | Spain F38 Futures; Sabadell, Spain; Clay $15,000 | (Canada) Steven Diez (Portugal) João Sousa; 6–3, 3–6, [10–7] | (Spain) Miguel Ángel López Jaén (Spain) Gabriel Trujillo Soler | (Germany) Kevin Krawietz (Japan) Taro Daniel | (Spain) Marc Fornell Mestres (Switzerland) Michael Lammer (Italy) Daniele Giorgini (Spain) Gerard Granollers |
| October 17 | Turkey F28 Futures; Adana, Turkey; Hard $10,000 | (Canada) Érik Chvojka; 6–3, 6–1 | (Sweden) Daniel Berta | (Belgium) Yannik Reuter (Austria) Michael Linzer | (Germany) Maik Burlage (Turkey) Anıl Yüksel (Sweden) Patrik Brydolf (Denmark) Marc Ferrigno |
| October 17 | Turkey F28 Futures; Adana, Turkey; Hard $10,000 | (Austria) Michael Linzer (Austria) Marco Mirnegg; 6–4, 6–3 | (Ukraine) Vladyslav Manafov (Poland) Maciej Smoła | (Belgium) Yannik Reuter (Austria) Michael Linzer | (Germany) Maik Burlage (Turkey) Anıl Yüksel (Sweden) Patrik Brydolf (Denmark) Marc Ferrigno |
| October 17 | USA F27 Futures; Mansfield, United States; Hard $15,000 | (United States) Jesse Levine; 6–4, 6–3 | (Australia) John-Patrick Smith | (Canada) Peter Polansky (Hungary) Dénes Lukács | (United States) Rhyne Williams (United States) Austin Krajicek (United States) Blake Strode (Australia) Carsten Ball |
| October 17 | USA F27 Futures; Mansfield, United States; Hard $15,000 | (United States) Devin Britton (United States) Jordan Cox; 2–6, 6–2, [10–7] | (United States) Sekou Bangoura (United States) Blake Strode | (Canada) Peter Polansky (Hungary) Dénes Lukács | (United States) Rhyne Williams (United States) Austin Krajicek (United States) Blake Strode (Australia) Carsten Ball |
| October 24 | Argentina F21 Futures; Rosario, Argentina; Clay $10,000 | (Argentina) Leandro Migani; 6–2, 7–5 | (Argentina) Renzo Olivo | (Argentina) Juan-Manuel Valverde (Argentina) Guillermo Durán | (Argentina) Maximiliano Estévez (Argentina) Diego Schwartzman (United States) Andrea Collarini (Argentina) Francisco Bahamonde |
| October 24 | Argentina F21 Futures; Rosario, Argentina; Clay $10,000 | (United States) Andrea Collarini (Argentina) Renzo Olivo; 4–6, 6–4, [11–9] | (Italy) Giammarco Micolani (Italy) Giorgio Portaluri | (Argentina) Juan-Manuel Valverde (Argentina) Guillermo Durán | (Argentina) Maximiliano Estévez (Argentina) Diego Schwartzman (United States) Andrea Collarini (Argentina) Francisco Bahamonde |
| October 24 | Australia F10 Futures; Port Pirie, Australia; Hard $15,000 | (Japan) Yasutaka Uchiyama; 7–6^{(8–6)}, 6–4 | (Japan) Hiroki Moriya | (Australia) Nick Lindahl (New Zealand) Jose Rubin Statham | (Australia) John Peers (Australia) Michael Look (Australia) Andrew McLeod (Australia) Gavin van Peperzeel |
| October 24 | Australia F10 Futures; Port Pirie, Australia; Hard $15,000 | (Australia) Robert McKenzie (Australia) John Peers; 6–7^{(3–7)}, 6–4, [10–8] | (New Zealand) G.D. Jones (New Zealand) Jose Rubin Statham | (Australia) Nick Lindahl (New Zealand) Jose Rubin Statham | (Australia) John Peers (Australia) Michael Look (Australia) Andrew McLeod (Australia) Gavin van Peperzeel |
| October 24 | Brazil F36 Futures; Porto Alegre, Brazil; Clay $10,000 | (Brazil) Guilherme Clézar; 7–5, 7–6^{(7–4)} | (Brazil) Leonardo Kirche | (Brazil) André Ghem (Argentina) Gastón-Arturo Grimolizzi | (Argentina) Juan-José Seminara (Argentina) Martín Ríos-Benítez (Brazil) Felipe Soares (Brazil) Thales Turini |
| October 24 | Brazil F36 Futures; Porto Alegre, Brazil; Clay $10,000 | (Brazil) Felipe Soares (Brazil) Thales Turini; 6–3, 6–3 | (Brazil) Gabriel Vicentini Pereira (Brazil) Pedro Sakamoto | (Brazil) André Ghem (Argentina) Gastón-Arturo Grimolizzi | (Argentina) Juan-José Seminara (Argentina) Martín Ríos-Benítez (Brazil) Felipe Soares (Brazil) Thales Turini |
| October 24 | Chile F10 Futures; Concepción, Chile; Clay $10,000 | (Chile) Cristóbal Saavedra Corválan; 6–3, 2–6, 6–4 | (Chile) Guillermo Hormazábal | (Chile) Juan Carlos Sáez (Belgium) Germain Gigounon | (Spain) Borja Rodríguez Manzano (Spain) Enrique López Pérez (Chile) Víctor Morales (Argentina) Facundo Mena |
| October 24 | Chile F10 Futures; Concepción, Chile; Clay $10,000 | (Chile) Javier Muñoz (Chile) Juan Carlos Sáez; 3–6, 7–5, [17–15] | (Chile) Alex Theiler (Chile) Ricardo Urzúa-Rivera | (Chile) Juan Carlos Sáez (Belgium) Germain Gigounon | (Spain) Borja Rodríguez Manzano (Spain) Enrique López Pérez (Chile) Víctor Morales (Argentina) Facundo Mena |
| October 24 | Croatia F14 Futures; Dubrovnik, Croatia; Clay $15,000 | (Bosnia and Herzegovina) Damir Džumhur; 6–4, 7–6^{(7–4)} | (Czech Republic) Marek Michalička | (Italy) Enrico Burzi (Slovenia) Janez Semrajc | (Slovenia) Andraž Bedene (Austria) Marc Rath (Hungary) Márton Fucsovics (Italy) Marco Cecchinato |
| October 24 | Croatia F14 Futures; Dubrovnik, Croatia; Clay $15,000 | (Croatia) Marin Draganja (Croatia) Dino Marcan; 7–6^{(7–4)}, 7–6^{(7–3)} | (Romania) Victor Anagnastopol (Romania) Florin Mergea | (Italy) Enrico Burzi (Slovenia) Janez Semrajc | (Slovenia) Andraž Bedene (Austria) Marc Rath (Hungary) Márton Fucsovics (Italy) Marco Cecchinato |
| October 24 | France F20 Futures; Rodez, France; Hard (indoor) $15,000+H | (Belgium) David Goffin; 6–3, 6–2 | (Spain) Adrián Menéndez | (Germany) Peter Gojowczyk (France) Romain Jouan | (France) Tristan Lamasine (France) Albano Olivetti (Republic of Ireland) Conor Niland (France) Josselin Ouanna |
| October 24 | France F20 Futures; Rodez, France; Hard (indoor) $15,000+H | (France) Pierre-Hugues Herbert (France) Albano Olivetti; 6–4, 6–3 | (South Africa) Jean Andersen (Republic of Ireland) James Cluskey | (Germany) Peter Gojowczyk (France) Romain Jouan | (France) Tristan Lamasine (France) Albano Olivetti (Republic of Ireland) Conor Niland (France) Josselin Ouanna |
| October 24 | Great Britain F17 Futures; Cardiff, Great Britain; Hard (indoor) $15,000 | (Czech Republic) Jan Minář; 6–7^{(3–7)}, 6–2, 7–6^{(7–3)} | (Poland) Marcin Gawron | (United Kingdom) Marcus Willis (United Kingdom) Richard Bloomfield | (Finland) Timo Nieminen (Poland) Grzegorz Panfil (United Kingdom) Joshua Milton (Italy) Andrea Arnaboldi |
| October 24 | Great Britain F17 Futures; Cardiff, Great Britain; Hard (indoor) $15,000 | (United Kingdom) Oliver Golding (United Kingdom) Sean Thornley; 6–4, 6–4 | (United Kingdom) Daniel Cox (United Kingdom) Daniel Smethurst | (United Kingdom) Marcus Willis (United Kingdom) Richard Bloomfield | (Finland) Timo Nieminen (Poland) Grzegorz Panfil (United Kingdom) Joshua Milton (Italy) Andrea Arnaboldi |
| October 24 | Kuwait F2 Futures; Meshref, Kuwait; Hard $10,000 | (Belgium) Julien Dubail; 6–3, 4–6, 6–4 | (Switzerland) Henri Laaksonen | (Belgium) Alexandre Folie (Kuwait) Mohammad Ghareeb | (Italy) Edoardo Eremin (Italy) Claudio Grassi (Spain) Iván Arenas-Gualda (Russia) Mikhail Vasiliev |
| October 24 | Kuwait F2 Futures; Meshref, Kuwait; Hard $10,000 | (Germany) Florian Fallert (Germany) Nils Langer; 6–4, 7–6^{(8–6)} | (Switzerland) Henri Laaksonen (Switzerland) Luca Margaroli | (Belgium) Alexandre Folie (Kuwait) Mohammad Ghareeb | (Italy) Edoardo Eremin (Italy) Claudio Grassi (Spain) Iván Arenas-Gualda (Russia) Mikhail Vasiliev |
| October 24 | Laos F1 Futures; Vientiane, Laos; Hard $10,000 | (Thailand) Kittipong Wachiramanowong; 2–6, 6–2, 6–4 | (Thailand) Danai Udomchoke | (South Korea) Jun Woong-sun (France) Laurent Rochette | (India) Rohan Gajjar (Japan) Arata Onozawa (Philippines) Dennis Lajola (France) Yannick Jankovits |
| October 24 | Laos F1 Futures; Vientiane, Laos; Hard $10,000 | (Thailand) Sanchai Ratiwatana (Thailand) Sonchat Ratiwatana; 6–2, 6–3 | (Japan) Bumpei Sato (Thailand) Danai Udomchoke | (South Korea) Jun Woong-sun (France) Laurent Rochette | (India) Rohan Gajjar (Japan) Arata Onozawa (Philippines) Dennis Lajola (France) Yannick Jankovits |
| October 24 | Nigeria F4 Futures; Lagos, Nigeria; Hard $15,000+H | (Slovakia) Kamil Čapkovič; 6–2, 7–5 | (India) Vijayant Malik | (Croatia) Ante Pavić (India) Yuki Bhambri | (India) Ranjeet Virali-Murugesan (India) Vishnu Vardhan (South Africa) Ruan Roelofse (India) Karan Rastogi |
| October 24 | Nigeria F4 Futures; Lagos, Nigeria; Hard $15,000+H | (France) Paterne Mamata (Uzbekistan) Vaja Uzakov; 7–5, 3–6, [10–6] | (Nigeria) Abdul-Mumin Babalola (Senegal) Daouda Ndiaye | (Croatia) Ante Pavić (India) Yuki Bhambri | (India) Ranjeet Virali-Murugesan (India) Vishnu Vardhan (South Africa) Ruan Roelofse (India) Karan Rastogi |
| October 24 | Spain F39 Futures; Vilafranca, Spain; Clay $10,000 | (Canada) Steven Diez; 3–6, 6–2, 6–4 | (Spain) Jordi Samper Montaña | (France) Jérôme Inzerillo (Germany) Jean-Marc Werner | (Spain) Gerard Granollers (Spain) Marc Fornell Mestres (Spain) Roberto Ortega Olmedo (Japan) Taro Daniel |
| October 24 | Spain F39 Futures; Vilafranca, Spain; Clay $10,000 | (Spain) Roberto Carballés Baena (Spain) Gerard Granollers; 3–6, 6–3, [11–9] | (Spain) Miguel Ángel López Jaén (Spain) Gabriel Trujillo Soler | (France) Jérôme Inzerillo (Germany) Jean-Marc Werner | (Spain) Gerard Granollers (Spain) Marc Fornell Mestres (Spain) Roberto Ortega Olmedo (Japan) Taro Daniel |
| October 24 | Turkey F29 Futures; Antalya, Turkey; Hard $10,000 | (France) Gleb Sakharov; 5–7, 6–2, 7–5 | (Germany) Michel Dornbusch | (Sweden) Daniel Berta (Germany) Marvin Netuschil | (Czech Republic) Jiří Veselý (Russia) Sergey Krotiouk (Italy) Federico Gaio (Slovakia) Norbert Gombos |
| October 24 | Turkey F29 Futures; Antalya, Turkey; Hard $10,000 | (Italy) Viktor Galović (Romania) Andrei Mlendea; 7–6^{(7–1)}, 6–4 | (Italy) Massimo Capone (Italy) Alessandro Colella | (Sweden) Daniel Berta (Germany) Marvin Netuschil | (Czech Republic) Jiří Veselý (Russia) Sergey Krotiouk (Italy) Federico Gaio (Slovakia) Norbert Gombos |
| October 24 | USA F28 Futures; Birmingham, United States; Clay $10,000 | (Australia) Jason Kubler; 6–3, 6–2 | (Japan) Yoshihito Nishioka | (France) Nicolas Devilder (Canada) Milan Pokrajac | (Russia) Artem Ilyushin (Chile) Pedro Graber-Anguita (Germany) Peter Heller (Spain) Guillermo Gómez-Díaz |
| October 24 | USA F28 Futures; Birmingham, United States; Clay $10,000 | (Romania) Andrei Dăescu (Canada) Milan Pokrajac; 6–2, 6–2 | (United States) Sekou Bangoura (United States) Evan King | (France) Nicolas Devilder (Canada) Milan Pokrajac | (Russia) Artem Ilyushin (Chile) Pedro Graber-Anguita (Germany) Peter Heller (Spain) Guillermo Gómez-Díaz |
| October 31 | Australia F11 Futures; Happy Valley, Australia; Hard $15,000 | (Australia) Michael Look; 6–4, 6–4 | (Australia) Colin Ebelthite | (Australia) Matthew Barton (New Zealand) José Statham | (New Zealand) Marcus Daniell (Australia) Nick Lindahl (United Kingdom) Toby Martin (Australia) Yuri Bezeruk |
| October 31 | Australia F11 Futures; Happy Valley, Australia; Hard $15,000 | (Australia) Robert McKenzie (Australia) John Peers; 6–4, 6–2 | (Australia) Jack Schipanski (Australia) Li Tu | (Australia) Matthew Barton (New Zealand) José Statham | (New Zealand) Marcus Daniell (Australia) Nick Lindahl (United Kingdom) Toby Martin (Australia) Yuri Bezeruk |
| October 31 | Brazil F37 Futures; Porto Alegre, Brazil; Clay $10,000 | (Brazil) Fabiano de Paula; 2–6, 6–4, 6–3 | (Argentina) Gastón-Arturo Grimolizzi | (Brazil) Thales Turini (Brazil) Leonardo Kirche | (Brazil) João Pedro Sorgi (Brazil) Alessandro Ventre (Brazil) Felipe Soares (Brazil) Thiago Monteiro |
| October 31 | Brazil F37 Futures; Porto Alegre, Brazil; Clay $10,000 | (Brazil) Fabiano de Paula (Brazil) Diego Matos; 7–5, 6–1 | (Brazil) Augusto Laranja (Brazil) Gabriel Vicentini Pereira | (Brazil) Thales Turini (Brazil) Leonardo Kirche | (Brazil) João Pedro Sorgi (Brazil) Alessandro Ventre (Brazil) Felipe Soares (Brazil) Thiago Monteiro |
| October 31 | Burundi F1 Futures; Bujumbura, Burundi; Clay $10,000 | (Austria) Gerald Melzer; 6–4, 6–2 | (South Africa) Ruan Roelofse | (Italy) Alessandro Bega (Italy) Francesco Vilardo | (Morocco) Anas Fattar (Italy) Matteo Civarolo (Austria) Lukas Jastraunig (Morocco) Younès Rachidi |
| October 31 | Burundi F1 Futures; Bujumbura, Burundi; Clay $10,000 | (Italy) Alessandro Bega (Italy) Riccardo Sinicropi; 6–1, 6–2 | (Italy) Davide Della Tommasina (Italy) Emanuele Molina | (Italy) Alessandro Bega (Italy) Francesco Vilardo | (Morocco) Anas Fattar (Italy) Matteo Civarolo (Austria) Lukas Jastraunig (Morocco) Younès Rachidi |
| October 31 | Chile F11 Futures; Concepción, Chile; Clay $10,000 | (Chile) Guillermo Hormazábal; 6–4, 4–6, 6–2 | (Chile) Cristóbal Saavedra Corvalán | (Chile) Javier Muñoz (Italy) Filippo Leonardi | (Argentina) Federico Coria (Spain) Enrique López Pérez (Chile) Juan Carlos Sáez (Chile) Nicolás Gustavo Kauer |
| October 31 | Chile F11 Futures; Concepción, Chile; Clay $10,000 | (Argentina) Federico Coria (Argentina) Gabriel Alejandro Hidalgo; 3–6, 7–6^{(8–6)}, [10–7] | (Chile) Gonzalo Lama (Chile) Cristóbal Saavedra Corvalán | (Chile) Javier Muñoz (Italy) Filippo Leonardi | (Argentina) Federico Coria (Spain) Enrique López Pérez (Chile) Juan Carlos Sáez (Chile) Nicolás Gustavo Kauer |
| October 31 | Kuwait F3 Futures; Meshref, Kuwait; Hard $10,000 | (Germany) Jaan-Frederik Brunken; 7–6^{(9–7)}, 6–4 | (Russia) Mikhail Vasiliev | (Netherlands) Miliaan Niesten (Belgium) Julien Dubail | (Belgium) Alexandre Folie (Italy) Roberto Marcora (Sweden) Kalle Averfalk (Kuwait) Mohammad Ghareeb |
| October 31 | Kuwait F3 Futures; Meshref, Kuwait; Hard $10,000 | (Spain) Iván Arenas-Gualda (Spain) Jaime Pulgar-García; 6–4, 7–5 | (Switzerland) Claude Benz (North Macedonia) Stefan Micov | (Netherlands) Miliaan Niesten (Belgium) Julien Dubail | (Belgium) Alexandre Folie (Italy) Roberto Marcora (Sweden) Kalle Averfalk (Kuwait) Mohammad Ghareeb |
| October 31 | Spain F41 Futures; Madrid, Spain; Clay $10,000 | (Canada) Steven Diez; 6–0, 6–2 | (Netherlands) Matthew Pierot | (Spain) Albert Alcaraz Ivorra (Spain) Roberto Ortega Olmedo | (Italy) Marco Viola (Spain) Jordi Samper Montaña (Spain) Marc Giner (Portugal) Gonçalo Falcão |
| October 31 | Spain F41 Futures; Madrid, Spain; Clay $10,000 | (Spain) Juan-Samuel Arauzo-Martínez (Spain) Marcos Esparcia Omedas; 7–5, 7–6^{(7–2)} | (Spain) Pedro-Hector Alonso Abajo (Spain) Sergio Arevalillo | (Spain) Albert Alcaraz Ivorra (Spain) Roberto Ortega Olmedo | (Italy) Marco Viola (Spain) Jordi Samper Montaña (Spain) Marc Giner (Portugal) Gonçalo Falcão |
| October 31 | Thailand F4 Futures; Phuket, Thailand; Hard (indoor) $10,000 | (South Korea) Cho Soong-jae; 6–0, 6–4 | (France) Yannick Jankovits | (Thailand) Danai Udomchoke (Indonesia) Christopher Rungkat | (India) Rohan Gajjar (Germany) Richard Becker (France) Laurent Rochette (China) Li Zhe |
| October 31 | Thailand F4 Futures; Phuket, Thailand; Hard (indoor) $10,000 | (Thailand) Sanchai Ratiwatana (Thailand) Sonchat Ratiwatana; 7–6^{(12–10)}, 6–4 | (Russia) Victor Baluda (Chinese Taipei) Jimmy Wang | (Thailand) Danai Udomchoke (Indonesia) Christopher Rungkat | (India) Rohan Gajjar (Germany) Richard Becker (France) Laurent Rochette (China) Li Zhe |
| October 31 | Turkey F30 Futures; Antalya, Turkey; Hard $10,000 | (Germany) Marvin Netuschil; 6–2, 4–1, retired | (Russia) Aleksandr Lobkov | (Slovakia) Norbert Gombos (Finland) Juho Paukku | (Romania) Andrei Mlendea (Belgium) Yannik Reuter (Moldova) Maxim Dubarenco (Italy) Riccardo Bellotti |
| October 31 | Turkey F30 Futures; Antalya, Turkey; Hard $10,000 | (France) Gleb Sakharov (Luxembourg) Mike Vermeer; 7–5, 6–3 | (Germany) Michel Dornbusch (Germany) George von Massow | (Slovakia) Norbert Gombos (Finland) Juho Paukku | (Romania) Andrei Mlendea (Belgium) Yannik Reuter (Moldova) Maxim Dubarenco (Italy) Riccardo Bellotti |
| October 31 | USA F29 Futures; Niceville, United States; Clay $10,000 | (Australia) Jason Kubler; 6–2, 6–4 | (Czech Republic) Roman Vögeli | (Russia) Artem Ilyushin (Lebanon) Bassam Beidas | (Germany) Peter Heller (Haiti) Olivier Sajous (Serbia) Vladimir Obradović (Monaco) Benjamin Balleret |
| October 31 | USA F29 Futures; Niceville, United States; Clay $10,000 | (Lebanon) Bassam Beidas (Czech Republic) Roman Vögeli; 6–4, 6–0 | (United States) Harrison Adams (United States) Shane Vinsant | (Russia) Artem Ilyushin (Lebanon) Bassam Beidas | (Germany) Peter Heller (Haiti) Olivier Sajous (Serbia) Vladimir Obradović (Monaco) Benjamin Balleret |

== November ==
| Week of | Tournament | Winner | Runners-up | Semifinalists | Quarterfinalists |
|---|---|---|---|---|---|
| November 7 | Brazil F38 Futures; Salvador, Brazil; Hard $10,000 | (Brazil) Thiago Monteiro; 7–6^{(7–2)}, 6–4 | (Brazil) Alexandre Schnitman | (Brazil) Bruno Sant'Anna (Brazil) Guilherme Clezar | (Brazil) Pedro Sakamoto (Brazil) Wilson Leite (United States) Joshua Zavala (Brazil) Fabiano de Paula |
| November 7 | Brazil F38 Futures; Salvador, Brazil; Hard $10,000 | (Italy) Giammarco Micolani (Italy) Giorgio Portaluri; 6–1, 6–1 | (Brazil) Raul Francisquiny (Brazil) Pedro Sakamoto | (Brazil) Bruno Sant'Anna (Brazil) Guilherme Clezar | (Brazil) Pedro Sakamoto (Brazil) Wilson Leite (United States) Joshua Zavala (Brazil) Fabiano de Paula |
| November 7 | Chile F12 Futures; Temuco, Chile; Clay $10,000 | (Chile) Cristóbal Saavedra Corvalán; 6–2, 7–5 | (Italy) Giulio Torroni | (Argentina) Juan Ignacio Londero (Chile) Gonzalo Lama | (Switzerland) Joss Espasandin (Ecuador) Juan Sebastián Vivanco (Chile) Jorge Montero (Chile) Hans Podlipnik Castillo |
| November 7 | Chile F12 Futures; Temuco, Chile; Clay $10,000 | (Argentina) Federico Coria (Argentina) Gabriel Alejandro Hidalgo; 6–2, 7–5 | (Italy) Filippo Leonardi (Italy) Giulio Torroni | (Argentina) Juan Ignacio Londero (Chile) Gonzalo Lama | (Switzerland) Joss Espasandin (Ecuador) Juan Sebastián Vivanco (Chile) Jorge Montero (Chile) Hans Podlipnik Castillo |
| November 7 | Chinese Taipei F3 Futures; Tainan, Chinese Taipei; Clay $15,000 | (Russia) Victor Baluda; 6–3, 6–3 | (Spain) Dario Pérez | (China) Ouyang Bowen (Chinese Taipei) Yi Chu-huan | (Germany) Sebastian Rieschick (Chinese Taipei) Chang Huai-en (Chinese Taipei) Wang Chieh-fu (Chinese Taipei) Chen Ti |
| November 7 | Chinese Taipei F3 Futures; Tainan, Chinese Taipei; Clay $15,000 | (Chinese Taipei) Huang Liang-chi (Chinese Taipei) Yi Chu-huan; 6–3, 6–4 | (Bulgaria) Alexandar Lazov (Austria) Nikolaus Moser | (China) Ouyang Bowen (Chinese Taipei) Yi Chu-huan | (Germany) Sebastian Rieschick (Chinese Taipei) Chang Huai-en (Chinese Taipei) Wang Chieh-fu (Chinese Taipei) Chen Ti |
| November 7 | India F9 Futures; Chennai, India; Hard $10,000 | (India) Saketh Myneni; 6–1, 6–4 | (United Kingdom) James Marsalek | (Japan) Junn Mitsuhashi (Spain) Roberto Ortega Olmedo | (India) Karunuday Singh (India) Rohan Gajjar (India) Vijay Sundar Prashanth (Spain) Iván Arenas-Gualda |
| November 7 | India F9 Futures; Chennai, India; Hard $10,000 | (India) Mohit Mayur Jayaprakash (India) Saketh Myneni; 6–4, 6–3 | (India) Rohan Gajjar (India) Vijay Kannan | (Japan) Junn Mitsuhashi (Spain) Roberto Ortega Olmedo | (India) Karunuday Singh (India) Rohan Gajjar (India) Vijay Sundar Prashanth (Spain) Iván Arenas-Gualda |
| November 7 | Iran F3 Futures; Kish Island, Iran; Clay $15,000 | (Netherlands) Boy Westerhof; 6–4, 6–3 | (Austria) Marc Rath | (Italy) Enrico Burzi (Poland) Grzegorz Panfil | (France) Julien Obry (Chile) Laslo Urrutia Fuentes (Ukraine) Ivan Sergeyev (Russia) Ervand Gasparyan |
| November 7 | Iran F3 Futures; Kish Island, Iran; Clay $15,000 | (Italy) Enrico Burzi (Russia) Mikhail Vasiliev; 6–3, 6–3 | (Netherlands) Stephan Fransen (France) Julien Obry | (Italy) Enrico Burzi (Poland) Grzegorz Panfil | (France) Julien Obry (Chile) Laslo Urrutia Fuentes (Ukraine) Ivan Sergeyev (Russia) Ervand Gasparyan |
| November 7 | Rwanda F1 Futures; Kigali, Rwanda; Clay $10,000 | (Egypt) Mohamed Safwat; 6–3, 6–2 | (Egypt) Karim-Mohamed Maamoun | (Italy) Alessandro Bega (Egypt) Sherif Sabry | (Italy) Francesco Vilardo (Italy) Riccardo Sinicropi (Italy) Damiano Di Ienno (France) Paterne Mamata |
| November 7 | Rwanda F1 Futures; Kigali, Rwanda; Clay $10,000 | (Austria) Gerald Melzer (South Africa) Ruan Roelofse; 6–7^{(1–7)}, 7–6^{(7–4)}, [10–8] | (Egypt) Omar Hedayet (Egypt) Karim-Mohamed Maamoun | (Italy) Alessandro Bega (Egypt) Sherif Sabry | (Italy) Francesco Vilardo (Italy) Riccardo Sinicropi (Italy) Damiano Di Ienno (France) Paterne Mamata |
| November 7 | Thailand F5 Futures; Phuket, Thailand; Hard $10,000 | (France) Laurent Rochette; 6–4, 7–6^{(7–4)} | (Chinese Taipei) Jimmy Wang | (France) Yannick Jankovits (China) Li Zhe | (Germany) Richard Becker (Philippines) Jeson Patrombon (France) Mick Lescure (United States) Dennis Lajola |
| November 7 | Thailand F5 Futures; Phuket, Thailand; Hard $10,000 | (China) Li Zhe (Canada) Kelsey Stevenson; 6–4, 4–6, [10–3] | (Thailand) Weerapat Doakmaiklee (Thailand) Kirati Siributwong | (France) Yannick Jankovits (China) Li Zhe | (Germany) Richard Becker (Philippines) Jeson Patrombon (France) Mick Lescure (United States) Dennis Lajola |
| November 7 | Turkey F31 Futures; Antalya, Turkey; Hard $10,000 | (Germany) Stefan Seifert; 3–6, 7–5, 6–3 | (Austria) Dominic Thiem | (Serbia) Marko Djokovic (Germany) Michel Dornbusch | (Greece) Alexandros Jakupovic (Germany) George von Massow (France) Gleb Sakharov (Italy) Riccardo Bellotti |
| November 7 | Turkey F31 Futures; Antalya, Turkey; Hard $10,000 | (Moldova) Andrei Ciumac (Moldova) Maxim Dubarenco; 7–5, 6–4 | (Russia) Aleksandr Lobkov (Uzbekistan) Vaja Uzakov | (Serbia) Marko Djokovic (Germany) Michel Dornbusch | (Greece) Alexandros Jakupovic (Germany) George von Massow (France) Gleb Sakharov (Italy) Riccardo Bellotti |
| November 7 | USA F30 Futures; Pensacola, USA; Clay $10,000 | (Monaco) Benjamin Balleret; 6–1, 6–7^{(2–7)}; 6–4 | (Australia) Maverick Banes | (Germany) Tim Pütz (Romania) Cătălin-Ionuț Gârd | (Australia) Jason Kubler (Australia) Chris Letcher (United Kingdom) Liam Broady (France) Alexandre Lacroix |
| November 7 | USA F30 Futures; Pensacola, USA; Clay $10,000 | (Canada) Kamil Pajkowski (United States) Maciek Sykut; 6–3, 6–4 | (Australia) Chris Letcher (Australia) Brendan Moore | (Germany) Tim Pütz (Romania) Cătălin-Ionuț Gârd | (Australia) Jason Kubler (Australia) Chris Letcher (United Kingdom) Liam Broady (France) Alexandre Lacroix |
| November 14 | Australia F12 Futures; Traralgon, Australia; Hard $15,000 | (Australia) Benjamin Mitchell; 7–6^{(7–3)}, 6–7^{(2–7)}, 6–0 | (New Zealand) Michael Venus | (China) Zhang Ze (Australia) Matt Reid | (United States) Jack Schipanski (Australia) Dane Propoggia (Japan) Hiroki Moriya (United Kingdom) Toby Martin |
| November 14 | Australia F12 Futures; Traralgon, Australia; Hard $15,000 | (Australia) Luke Saville (Australia) Andrew Whittington; 4–6, 6–4, [10–5] | (Australia) John Peers (Australia) Dane Propoggia | (China) Zhang Ze (Australia) Matt Reid | (United States) Jack Schipanski (Australia) Dane Propoggia (Japan) Hiroki Moriya (United Kingdom) Toby Martin |
| November 14 | Brazil F39 Futures; Juiz de Fora, Brazil; Clay $10,000 | (Brazil) Guilherme Clezar; 6–3, 6–2 | (Brazil) Fabiano de Paula | (United States) Joshua Zavala (Brazil) Eládio Ribeiro Neto | (Brazil) João Pedro Sorgi (Italy) Francesco Garzelli (Sweden) Christian Lindell (Brazil) Gabriel Dias |
| November 14 | Brazil F39 Futures; Juiz de Fora, Brazil; Clay $10,000 | (Brazil) Clayton Almeida (United States) Joshua Zavala; 6–7^{(4–7)}, 7–6^{(7–2)}, [12–10] | (Brazil) Gabriel Vicentini Pereira (Brazil) João Pedro Sorgi | (United States) Joshua Zavala (Brazil) Eládio Ribeiro Neto | (Brazil) João Pedro Sorgi (Italy) Francesco Garzelli (Sweden) Christian Lindell (Brazil) Gabriel Dias |
| November 14 | Chile F13 Futures; Osorno, so Chile; Clay $10,000 | (Chile) Guillermo Rivera Aránguiz; 6–4, 6–4 | (Chile) Hans Podlipnik Castillo | (Chile) Juan Carlos Sáez (Chile) Matías Sborowitz | (Italy) Giulio Torroni (Chile) Javier Muñoz (Chile) Carlos González-Leiva (Italy) Filippo Leonardi |
| November 14 | Chile F13 Futures; Osorno, so Chile; Clay $10,000 | (Chile) Javier Muñoz (Chile) Juan Carlos Sáez; 3–6, 6–4, [10–1] | (Venezuela) Luis David Martínez (Mexico) Manuel Sánchez | (Chile) Juan Carlos Sáez (Chile) Matías Sborowitz | (Italy) Giulio Torroni (Chile) Javier Muñoz (Chile) Carlos González-Leiva (Italy) Filippo Leonardi |
| November 14 | Chinese Taipei F4 Futures; Tainan, Chinese Taipei; Clay $15,000 | (Russia) Victor Baluda; 6–7^{(6–8)}, 6–3, 7–5 | (Chinese Taipei) Chen Ti | (Germany) Sebastian Rieschick (Chinese Taipei) Huang Liang-chi | (Spain) Dario Pérez (Austria) Nikolaus Moser (Japan) Arata Onozawa (Chinese Taipei) Peng Hsien-yin |
| November 14 | Chinese Taipei F4 Futures; Tainan, Chinese Taipei; Clay $15,000 | (Chinese Taipei) Huang Liang-chi (Chinese Taipei) Yi Chu-huan; 6–3, 6–4 | (Japan) Takuto Niki (Japan) Arata Onozawa | (Germany) Sebastian Rieschick (Chinese Taipei) Huang Liang-chi | (Spain) Dario Pérez (Austria) Nikolaus Moser (Japan) Arata Onozawa (Chinese Taipei) Peng Hsien-yin |
| November 14 | Czech Republic F4 Futures; Rožnov pod Radhoštěm, Czech Republic; Carpet (indoor) $15,000 | (United Kingdom) Alexander Ward; 6–3, 1–0 ret. | (United Kingdom) Josh Goodall | (Czech Republic) Roman Jebavý (Czech Republic) Adam Pavlásek | (Finland) Juho Paukku (Germany) Gero Kretschmer (Czech Republic) Robert Rumler (Croatia) Nikola Mektić |
| November 14 | Czech Republic F4 Futures; Rožnov pod Radhoštěm, Czech Republic; Carpet (indoor) $15,000 | (Czech Republic) Roman Jebavý (Czech Republic) Jan Šátral; 6–4, 6–3 | (Belarus) Siarhei Betau (Belarus) Aliaksandr Bury | (Czech Republic) Roman Jebavý (Czech Republic) Adam Pavlásek | (Finland) Juho Paukku (Germany) Gero Kretschmer (Czech Republic) Robert Rumler (Croatia) Nikola Mektić |
| November 14 | India F10 Futures; Pune, India; Hard $15,000 | (India) Jeevan Nedunchezhiyan; 6–4, 7–5 | (India) Vishnu Vardhan | (India) Yuki Bhambri (India) Ranjeet Virali-Murugesan | (Germany) Richard Becker (India) Karunuday Singh (India) Karan Rastogi (India) Vijayant Malik |
| November 14 | India F10 Futures; Pune, India; Hard $15,000 | (India) Rohan Gajjar (Germany) Alexander Satschko; 4–6, 7–6^{(7–1)}, [10–8] | (India) Karan Rastogi (India) Vishnu Vardhan | (India) Yuki Bhambri (India) Ranjeet Virali-Murugesan | (Germany) Richard Becker (India) Karunuday Singh (India) Karan Rastogi (India) Vijayant Malik |
| November 14 | Iran F4 Futures; Kish Island, Iran; Clay $15,000 | (Italy) Enrico Burzi; 3–6, 6–2, 6–2 | (Austria) Michael Linzer | (Chile) Laslo Urrutia Fuentes (Russia) Ervand Gasparyan | (France) Julien Obry (United Kingdom) James Feaver (Ukraine) Ivan Sergeyev (Austria) Marc Rath |
| November 14 | Iran F4 Futures; Kish Island, Iran; Clay $15,000 | (Italy) Enrico Burzi (Russia) Mikhail Vasiliev; 6–4, 6–7^{(4–7)}, [10–2] | (Netherlands) Stephan Fransen (France) Julien Obry | (Chile) Laslo Urrutia Fuentes (Russia) Ervand Gasparyan | (France) Julien Obry (United Kingdom) James Feaver (Ukraine) Ivan Sergeyev (Austria) Marc Rath |
| November 14 | Kazakhstan F6 Futures; Astana, Kazakhstan; Hard $10,000 | (Estonia) Vladimir Ivanov; 2–6, 6–3, 6–1 | (Russia) Mikhail Fufygin | (South Korea) Na Jung-woong (Czech Republic) Michal Schmid | (Russia) Andrey Kumantsov (Russia) Mikhail Biryukov (Belarus) Dzmitry Zhyrmont (Uzbekistan) Temur Ismailov |
| November 14 | Kazakhstan F6 Futures; Astana, Kazakhstan; Hard $10,000 | (Czech Republic) Michal Schmid (Slovakia) Adrian Sikora; 2–6, 6–1, [10–6] | (Russia) Mikhail Fufygin (Russia) Vitali Reshetnikov | (South Korea) Na Jung-woong (Czech Republic) Michal Schmid | (Russia) Andrey Kumantsov (Russia) Mikhail Biryukov (Belarus) Dzmitry Zhyrmont (Uzbekistan) Temur Ismailov |
| November 14 | Rwanda F2 Futures; Kigali, Rwanda; Clay $10,000 | (Austria) Gerald Melzer; 6–2, 6–4 | (Austria) Lukas Jastraunig | (Egypt) Mohamed Safwat (Switzerland) Lucas Zweili | (Egypt) Sherif Sabry (Italy) Emanuele Molina (Italy) Alessandro Bega (Austria) Marcus Weiglhofer |
| November 14 | Rwanda F2 Futures; Kigali, Rwanda; Clay $10,000 | (Austria) Lukas Jastraunig (Austria) Gerald Melzer; 6–2, 6–3 | (Egypt) Sherif Sabry (Egypt) Mohamed Safwat | (Egypt) Mohamed Safwat (Switzerland) Lucas Zweili | (Egypt) Sherif Sabry (Italy) Emanuele Molina (Italy) Alessandro Bega (Austria) Marcus Weiglhofer |
| November 14 | USA F31 Futures; Amelia Island, USA; Clay $10,000 | (Czech Republic) Rudolph Siwy; 4–6, 7–5, 6–3 | (Germany) Tim Pütz | (Australia) Jason Kubler (Monaco) Benjamin Balleret | (Italy) Matteo Viola (France) Alexandre Lacroix (Bolivia) Ryusei Makiguchi (Serbia) Vladimir Obradović |
| November 14 | USA F31 Futures; Amelia Island, USA; Clay $10,000 | (Czech Republic) Rudolph Siwy (Italy) Matteo Viola; 7–6^{(7–3)}, 6–1 | (France) Alexandre Lacroix (Germany) Tim Pütz | (Australia) Jason Kubler (Monaco) Benjamin Balleret | (Italy) Matteo Viola (France) Alexandre Lacroix (Bolivia) Ryusei Makiguchi (Serbia) Vladimir Obradović |
| November 21 | Australia F13 Futures; Bendigo, Australia; Hard $15,000 | (Australia) Matt Reid; 7–6^{(8–6)}, 4–6, 6–1 | (Australia) Benjamin Mitchell | (Australia) Michael Look (Australia) Samuel Groth | (New Zealand) José Statham (New Zealand) Michael Venus (Australia) Luke Saville (Australia) James Lemke |
| November 21 | Australia F13 Futures; Bendigo, Australia; Hard $15,000 | (Australia) Luke Saville (Australia) Andrew Whittington; 6–7^{(7–9)}, 6–4, [12–10] | (Australia) Matthew Barton (Australia) Michael Look | (Australia) Michael Look (Australia) Samuel Groth | (New Zealand) José Statham (New Zealand) Michael Venus (Australia) Luke Saville (Australia) James Lemke |
| November 21 | Brazil F40 Futures; Foz do Iguaçu, Brazil; Clay $10,000 | (Brazil) André Ghem; 6–3, 6–2 | (Brazil) João Pedro Sorgi | (Brazil) André Miele (Argentina) Valentín Florez | (Argentina) Renzo Olivo (Uruguay) Martín Cuevas (Argentina) Joaquín-Jesús Monteferrario (Argentina) Juan-Pablo Villar |
| November 21 | Brazil F40 Futures; Foz do Iguaçu, Brazil; Clay $10,000 | (Uruguay) Martín Cuevas (Argentina) Juan-Manuel Romanazzi; 6–4, 6–2 | (Italy) Giammarco Micolani (Italy) Giorgio Portaluri | (Brazil) André Miele (Argentina) Valentín Florez | (Argentina) Renzo Olivo (Uruguay) Martín Cuevas (Argentina) Joaquín-Jesús Monteferrario (Argentina) Juan-Pablo Villar |
| November 21 | Chile F14 Futures; Villa Alemana, Chile; Clay $10,000 | (Argentina) Diego Schwartzman; 6–0, 6–3 | (Chile) Guillermo Hormazábal | (Argentina) Juan-Pablo Amado (Argentina) Patricio Heras | (Chile) Matías Sborowitz (Chile) Jorge Aguilar (Chile) Hans Podlipnik Castillo (Peru) Mauricio Echazú |
| November 21 | Chile F14 Futures; Villa Alemana, Chile; Clay $10,000 | (Argentina) Juan-Pablo Amado (Argentina) Matías Salinas; 7–6^{(7–1)}, 7–5 | (Bolivia) Hugo Dellien (Argentina) Juan Vázquez-Valenzuela | (Argentina) Juan-Pablo Amado (Argentina) Patricio Heras | (Chile) Matías Sborowitz (Chile) Jorge Aguilar (Chile) Hans Podlipnik Castillo (Peru) Mauricio Echazú |
| November 21 | Czech Republic F5 Futures; Opava, Czech Republic; Carpet (indoor) $15,000 | (Poland) Andriej Kapaś; 7–6^{(7–5)}, 6–7^{(7–9)}, 6–4 | (Czech Republic) Michal Konečný | (Czech Republic) Jan Mertl (United Kingdom) Josh Goodall | (Belarus) Sergey Betov (United Kingdom) Alexander Ward (Czech Republic) Marek Michalička (Germany) Matthias Kolbe |
| November 21 | Czech Republic F5 Futures; Opava, Czech Republic; Carpet (indoor) $15,000 | (Belarus) Sergey Betov (Belarus) Aliaksandr Bury; 7–6^{(7–4)}, 6–2 | (Czech Republic) Michal Konečný (Ukraine) Leonard Stakhovsky | (Czech Republic) Jan Mertl (United Kingdom) Josh Goodall | (Belarus) Sergey Betov (United Kingdom) Alexander Ward (Czech Republic) Marek Michalička (Germany) Matthias Kolbe |
| November 21 | India F11 Futures; New Delhi, India; Hard $15,000 | (India) Vishnu Vardhan; 6–4, 4–6, 6–4 | (India) Rohan Gajjar | (India) Ranjeet Virali-Murugesan (United Kingdom) Daniel Cox | (Japan) Junn Mitsuhashi (India) Saketh Myneni (India) Sriram Balaji (India) Vijayant Malik |
| November 21 | India F11 Futures; New Delhi, India; Hard $15,000 | (India) Karan Rastogi (India) Vishnu Vardhan; 6–1, 6–3 | (India) Sriram Balaji (India) Vijayant Malik | (India) Ranjeet Virali-Murugesan (United Kingdom) Daniel Cox | (Japan) Junn Mitsuhashi (India) Saketh Myneni (India) Sriram Balaji (India) Vijayant Malik |
| November 21 | Kazakhstan F7 Futures; Almaty, Kazakhstan; Hard $10,000 | (Switzerland) Adrien Bossel; 6–2, 7–6^{(8–6)} | (Belarus) Dzmitry Zhyrmont | (Belgium) Julien Dubail (Russia) Mikhail Fufygin | (Russia) Victor Baluda (Russia) Sergei Krotiouk (Estonia) Vladimir Ivanov (Russia) Evgeny Karlovskiy |
| November 21 | Kazakhstan F7 Futures; Almaty, Kazakhstan; Hard $10,000 | (Russia) Vitaliy Kachanovskiy (Russia) Sergei Krotiouk; 7–6^{(7–1)}, 6–1 | (Belarus) Egor Gerasimov (Belarus) Yaraslav Shyla | (Belgium) Julien Dubail (Russia) Mikhail Fufygin | (Russia) Victor Baluda (Russia) Sergei Krotiouk (Estonia) Vladimir Ivanov (Russia) Evgeny Karlovskiy |
| November 21 | Turkey F32 Futures; Antalya, Turkey; Hard $10,000 | (Bosnia and Herzegovina) Damir Džumhur; 6–1, 6–1 | (Serbia) Ivan Bjelica | (Bosnia and Herzegovina) Aldin Šetkić (Bosnia and Herzegovina) Tomislav Brkić | (Belgium) Alexandre Folie (Egypt) Mohamed Safwat (France) Rudy Coco (Belgium) Gaëtan De Lovinfosse |
| November 21 | Turkey F32 Futures; Antalya, Turkey; Hard $10,000 | (Bosnia and Herzegovina) Damir Džumhur (Bosnia and Herzegovina) Aldin Šetkić; 6–4, 6–3 | (Serbia) Ivan Bjelica (Bosnia and Herzegovina) Tomislav Brkić | (Bosnia and Herzegovina) Aldin Šetkić (Bosnia and Herzegovina) Tomislav Brkić | (Belgium) Alexandre Folie (Egypt) Mohamed Safwat (France) Rudy Coco (Belgium) Gaëtan De Lovinfosse |
| November 28 | Chile F15 Futures; Viña del Mar, Chile; Clay $10,000 | (Argentina) Martín Alund; 6–1, 6–2 | (Argentina) Juan Vázquez-Valenzuela | (Chile) Cristóbal Saavedra Corvalán (Slovakia) Pavol Červenák | (Chile) Ignacio Lehyt (Chile) Hans Podlipnik Castillo (Argentina) Diego Schwartzman (Chile) Guillermo Hormazábal |
| November 28 | Chile F15 Futures; Viña del Mar, Chile; Clay $10,000 | (Argentina) Martín Alund (Argentina) Andrés Molteni; 6–4, 6–3 | (Chile) Jorge Aguilar (Chile) Guillermo Rivera Aránguiz | (Chile) Cristóbal Saavedra Corvalán (Slovakia) Pavol Červenák | (Chile) Ignacio Lehyt (Chile) Hans Podlipnik Castillo (Argentina) Diego Schwartzman (Chile) Guillermo Hormazábal |
| November 28 | India F12 Futures; Kolkata, India; Clay $10,000 | (India) Jeevan Nedunchezhiyan; 6–2, 6–1 | (India) Sriram Balaji | (India) Karunuday Singh (India) Vijay Sundar Prashanth | (Japan) Junn Mitsuhashi (Croatia) Mate Pavić (Spain) Jaime Pulgar-García (India) Vignesh Peranamallur |
| November 28 | India F12 Futures; Kolkata, India; Clay $10,000 | (India) Sriram Balaji (India) Kaza Vinayak Sharma; 6–3, 4–6, [10–3] | (India) Jeevan Nedunchezhiyan (India) Vijay Sundar Prashanth | (India) Karunuday Singh (India) Vijay Sundar Prashanth | (Japan) Junn Mitsuhashi (Croatia) Mate Pavić (Spain) Jaime Pulgar-García (India) Vignesh Peranamallur |
| November 28 | Kazakhstan F8 Futures; Astana, Kazakhstan; Hard (indoor) $10,000 | (Switzerland) Adrien Bossel; 7–6^{(7–3)}, 6–2 | (Belarus) Dzmitry Zhyrmont | (Belgium) Julien Dubail (Russia) Sergei Krotiouk | (Slovakia) Adrian Sikora (Belarus) Egor Gerasimov (Russia) Gleb Bagateliya (Russia) Mikhail Biryukov |
| November 28 | Kazakhstan F8 Futures; Astana, Kazakhstan; Hard (indoor) $10,000 | (Russia) Mikhail Fufygin (Russia) Vitali Reshetnikov; 6–4, 7–6^{(7–5)} | (Slovakia) Marko Daniš (Slovakia) Marek Semjan | (Belgium) Julien Dubail (Russia) Sergei Krotiouk | (Slovakia) Adrian Sikora (Belarus) Egor Gerasimov (Russia) Gleb Bagateliya (Russia) Mikhail Biryukov |
| November 28 | Mexico F14 Futures; Ixtapa, Mexico; Hard $10,000 | (Mexico) Daniel Garza; 6–3, 6–4 | (Germany) Jaan-Frederik Brunken | (Haiti) Olivier Sajous (Netherlands) Roel Oostdam | (Puerto Rico) Alex Llompart (United States) Adam El Mihdawy (Mexico) Miguel Gallardo Valles (Australia) Nima Roshan |
| November 28 | Mexico F14 Futures; Ixtapa, Mexico; Hard $10,000 | (Mexico) Luis Díaz Barriga (United States) Adam El Mihdawy; 6–4, 6–4 | (Mexico) César Ramírez (Australia) Nima Roshan | (Haiti) Olivier Sajous (Netherlands) Roel Oostdam | (Puerto Rico) Alex Llompart (United States) Adam El Mihdawy (Mexico) Miguel Gallardo Valles (Australia) Nima Roshan |
| November 28 | Turkey F33 Futures; Antalya, Turkey; Hard $10,000 | (France) Ludovic Walter; 6–2, 6–4 | (Bosnia and Herzegovina) Aldin Šetkić | (Egypt) Karim-Mohamed Maamoun (France) Gleb Sakharov | (United Kingdom) Oliver Golding (Russia) Ivan Nedelko (Germany) Gero Kretschmer (Georgia (country)) Nikoloz Basilashvili |
| November 28 | Turkey F33 Futures; Antalya, Turkey; Hard $10,000 | (Belgium) Joris De Loore (United Kingdom) Oliver Golding; 6–3, 7–6^{(7–5)} | (Bosnia and Herzegovina) Damir Džumhur (Bosnia and Herzegovina) Aldin Šetkić | (Egypt) Karim-Mohamed Maamoun (France) Gleb Sakharov | (United Kingdom) Oliver Golding (Russia) Ivan Nedelko (Germany) Gero Kretschmer (Georgia (country)) Nikoloz Basilashvili |

== December ==
| Week of | Tournament | Winner | Runners-up | Semifinalists | Quarterfinalists |
|---|---|---|---|---|---|
| December 5 | Brazil F42 Futures; Porto Alegre, Brazil; Clay $10,000 | (Argentina) Martín Alund; 3–6, 6–3, 6–4 | (Argentina) Guillermo Durán | (Uruguay) Martín Cuevas (Brazil) Ricardo Hocevar | (Argentina) Andrés Molteni (Argentina) Valentín Florez (Argentina) Patricio Heras (Brazil) Alessandro-Damiano Ventre |
| December 5 | Brazil F42 Futures; Porto Alegre, Brazil; Clay $10,000 | (Argentina) Guillermo Durán (Argentina) Renzo Olivo; 6–4, 6–2 | (Argentina) Martín Alund (Argentina) Andrés Molteni | (Uruguay) Martín Cuevas (Brazil) Ricardo Hocevar | (Argentina) Andrés Molteni (Argentina) Valentín Florez (Argentina) Patricio Heras (Brazil) Alessandro-Damiano Ventre |
| December 5 | Mexico F15 Futures; Tehuacán, Mexico; Hard $10,000 | (Colombia) Nicolás Barrientos; 7–6^{(8–6)}, 7–6^{(7–1)} | (Australia) Chris Letcher | (United States) Christian Harrison (Mexico) Daniel Garza | (Peru) Mauricio Echazú (United States) Adam El Mihdawy (Mexico) Miguel Gallardo Valles (Germany) Maximilian Wilde |
| December 5 | Mexico F15 Futures; Tehuacán, Mexico; Hard $10,000 | (Mexico) César Ramírez (Australia) Nima Roshan; 6–3, 6–1 | (Mexico) Daniel Garza (Mexico) Raúl-Isaias Rosas-Zarur | (United States) Christian Harrison (Mexico) Daniel Garza | (Peru) Mauricio Echazú (United States) Adam El Mihdawy (Mexico) Miguel Gallardo Valles (Germany) Maximilian Wilde |
| December 5 | Turkey F34 Futures; Antalya, Turkey; Hard $10,000 | (France) Ludovic Walter; 6–4, 6–4 | (Netherlands) Boy Westerhof | (Belgium) Joris De Loore (Serbia) Ivan Bjelica | (Italy) Riccardo Sinicropi (Monaco) Jean-René Lisnard (Italy) Antonio Comporto (Serbia) Marko Djokovic |
| December 5 | Turkey F34 Futures; Antalya, Turkey; Hard $10,000 | (Italy) Antonio Comporto (Italy) Riccardo Sinicropi; 2–6, 6–1, [10–2] | (Germany) Marvin Netuschil (Germany) Ralph Regus | (Belgium) Joris De Loore (Serbia) Ivan Bjelica | (Italy) Riccardo Sinicropi (Monaco) Jean-René Lisnard (Italy) Antonio Comporto (Serbia) Marko Djokovic |
| December 12 | Brazil F43 Futures; Guarulhos, Brazil; Clay $10,000 | (Argentina) Martín Alund; 6–4, 6–3 | (United States) Joshua Zavala | (Brazil) Felipe Soares (Austria) Michael Linzer | (Argentina) Maximiliano Estévez (Ecuador) Diego Hidalgo (United Kingdom) Edward Corrie (Brazil) Thales Turini |
| December 12 | Brazil F43 Futures; Guarulhos, Brazil; Clay $10,000 | (Brazil) Gustavo Guerses (Brazil) Pedro Sakamoto; 6–4, 4–6, [14–12] | (United Kingdom) Edward Corrie (United States) Jon Wiegand | (Brazil) Felipe Soares (Austria) Michael Linzer | (Argentina) Maximiliano Estévez (Ecuador) Diego Hidalgo (United Kingdom) Edward Corrie (Brazil) Thales Turini |
| December 12 | Mexico F16 Futures; Guadalajara, Mexico; Clay $10,000 | (Mexico) César Ramírez; 6–2, 6–1 | (Colombia) Nicolás Barrientos | (Austria) Bastian Trinker (United States) Will Gray | (Guatemala) Christopher Díaz Figueroa (Mexico) Miguel Gallardo Valles (Netherlands) Roel Oostdam (Argentina) Mariano Urli |
| December 12 | Mexico F16 Futures; Guadalajara, Mexico; Clay $10,000 | (Mexico) Luis Díaz Barriga (United States) Adam El Mihdawy; 6–3, 6–3 | (Mexico) Bruno Rodríguez (Mexico) Manuel Sánchez | (Austria) Bastian Trinker (United States) Will Gray | (Guatemala) Christopher Díaz Figueroa (Mexico) Miguel Gallardo Valles (Netherlands) Roel Oostdam (Argentina) Mariano Urli |
| December 12 | Turkey F35 Futures; Antalya, Turkey; Hard $10,000 | (Italy) Thomas Fabbiano; 6–2, 6–1 | (Germany) Stefan Seifert | (Italy) Lorenzo Giustino (United Kingdom) Oliver Golding | (Bosnia and Herzegovina) Tomislav Brkić (Bosnia and Herzegovina) Aldin Šetkić (France) Gleb Sakharov (Serbia) Marko Djokovic |
| December 12 | Turkey F35 Futures; Antalya, Turkey; Hard $10,000 | (United Kingdom) Oliver Golding (France) Gleb Sakharov; 6–2, 6–1 | (Italy) Antonio Comporto (Italy) Thomas Fabbiano | (Italy) Lorenzo Giustino (United Kingdom) Oliver Golding | (Bosnia and Herzegovina) Tomislav Brkić (Bosnia and Herzegovina) Aldin Šetkić (France) Gleb Sakharov (Serbia) Marko Djokovic |
| December 19 | Brazil F44 Futures; Brasília, Brazil; Clay $10,000 | (Austria) Michael Linzer; 6–0, 6–3 | (Brazil) Eládio Ribeiro Neto | (Argentina) Maximiliano Estévez (Brazil) Fabrício Neis | (Brazil) Fernando Romboli (Ecuador) Diego Hidalgo (Argentina) Juan Vázquez-Valenzuela (Brazil) Thiago Alves |
| December 19 | Brazil F44 Futures; Brasília, Brazil; Clay $10,000 | (Ecuador) Diego Hidalgo (Brazil) Fernando Romboli; 6–2, 6–4 | (Argentina) Maximiliano Estévez (Argentina) Agustín Picco | (Argentina) Maximiliano Estévez (Brazil) Fabrício Neis | (Brazil) Fernando Romboli (Ecuador) Diego Hidalgo (Argentina) Juan Vázquez-Valenzuela (Brazil) Thiago Alves |
