= Dairy Farmers of America =

U.S. national milk marketing cooperative

Dairy Farmers of America Inc.
- Type: Private
- Industry: Agriculture
- Predecessor: Associated Milk Producers, Inc.; Mid-America Dairymen, Inc.; Milk Marketing, Inc.; and Western Dairymen Cooperative, Inc.
- Founded: 1998; 28 years ago
- Headquarters: Kansas City, Kansas, United States
- Revenue: ▼US$13.6 billion (2018) ▲US$14.7 billion (2017)
- Net income: ▲US$131.8 million (2016)
- Number of employees: 18,000
- Website: dfamilk.com

Dairy Farmers of America Inc. (DFA) is a national milk marketing cooperative in the United States. DFA markets members' raw milk and sells milk and derivative products (dairy products, food components, ingredients and shelf-stable dairy products) to wholesale buyers both domestically and abroad. Net sales in 2016 were $13.5 billion, representing about 22 percent of raw milk production in the United States.

== History ==
DFA was formed in 1998 through the merger of four dairy cooperatives: the Southern region of Associated Milk Producers Inc.; Mid-America Dairymen Inc.; Milk Marketing Inc.; and Western Dairymen Cooperative Inc. Since then, five other cooperatives have become a part of DFA – Independent Cooperative Milk Producers Association, Valley of Virginia Milk Producers Association, California Cooperative Creamery, Black Hills Milk Producers and Dairylea Cooperative Inc. Its headquarters from 1998 until 2017 was near Kansas City International Airport in Kansas City, Missouri.

=== Milk case ===
In 1971, the Nixon administration faced pressure from dairy producers seeking higher federal price supports for milk. These supports were crucial for stabilizing milk prices and ensuring profitability for dairy farmers. At the time, the administration was also actively fundraising for Nixon’s re-election campaign.

The Milk Case was a 1974 corruption scandal in the United States involving the administration of Richard Nixon and the secretary of the treasury John Connally. The case revolved around revelations that the Nixon campaign accepted contributions from AMPI in exchange for an increase to the federal price of milk.

Investigations revealed that the Associated Milk Producers Inc. (AMPI), a major dairy cooperative, had pledged significant financial contributions to Nixon’s campaign. In August 1969, a lawyer for AMPI delivered $100,000 in a briefcase to Herbert Kalmbach, President Nixon’s personal attorney. This transaction raised suspicions of a quid pro quo arrangement, suggesting that the administration’s subsequent decision to raise milk price supports was influenced by these contributions.

The scandal led to legal actions against key figures. In July 1974, former Treasury Secretary John B. Connally Jr. was indicted on charges including accepting illegal payments, perjury, and obstruction of justice. The indictment alleged that Connally had received $10,000 from AMPI in exchange for influencing the administration’s decision on milk price supports. The prosecution’s case relied heavily on testimony from Jake Jacobsen, a lawyer for the milk producers, who claimed to have delivered the payments to Connally. However, Connally was acquitted of all charges in 1975, as the jury found insufficient evidence to convict him.

=== 21st century ===
In 2011, DFA acquired Kemps of St. Paul, Minnesota, and its subsidiaries from HP Hood. In 2014, DFA acquired Oakhurst, and Dairylea Cooperative Inc. merged with the farmer-owned Cooperative. DFA became the sole owner of DairiConcepts in 2015, which was once a partnership between DFA and Fonterra Co-operative Group Unlimited. DFA also acquired Cumberland Dairy, a processor of ultra-pasteurized dairy products, in 2017.

In February 2020, DFA agreed to buy Dean Foods, the largest U.S. milk producer for $433 million. As part of the deal, DFA would acquire 44 of Dean's plants. In May 2020 that deal was finalized and the acquisition was completed.

== Brands ==
- Arla (under license)
- Fromageries Bel (under license)
- Breakstone's Butter (Note: Trademark licensed from Lactalis)
- Cache Valley Creamery
- California Gold Dairy Products
- Cass-Clay Creamery
- Craigs Station Creamery
- Dairy Maid Dairy
- Falfurrias
- Guida's Dairy
- Hotel Bar
- Keller's Creamery
- Kemps
- La Vaquita
- Live Real Farms
- Meadow Gold
- Oakhurst
- Plugrá
- Sport Shake
- The Creamery

== Commodity price manipulation issues ==
In 2008, the Dairy Farmers of America and two former executives agreed to pay $12 million to settle Commodity Futures Trading Commission charges for attempting to manipulate the Class III milk futures contract and exceeding speculative position limits in that contract.

== See also ==
- List of dairy product companies in the United States
