= Michael-Ray Pallares González =

Dominican Republic tennis player (born 1980)

- Pallares González in 2026
- Country (sports): Dominican Republic
- Residence: Tampa, Florida, U.S.
- Born: 15 December 1980 (age 45) Englewood, New Jersey
- Height: 6 ft 2 in (1.88 m)
- Turned pro: 2004
- Plays: Right-handed (two-handed backhand)
- Prize money: $10,219 USD

Singles
- Career record: 1-0 (ATP Tour level, Grand Slam level, and Davis Cup)
- Career titles: 0
- Highest ranking: No. 1183 (31 January 2005)

Doubles
- Career record: 0-0 (ATP Tour level, Grand Slam level, and Davis Cup)
- Career titles: 0
- Highest ranking: No. 1157 (8 October 2012)
- Last updated on: 22 June 2019.

Michael-Ray Pallares González (born December 15, 1980) is a professional tennis player from the Dominican Republic. He was a member of the Dominican Republic Davis Cup team and represented his country at the Central American and Caribbean Games.

He won the men's singles gold medal at the 2022 State Games of America, an Olympic-style multi-sport event held in North America. It is organized by the National Congress of State Games as part of the United States Olympic Committee in which athletes qualify for the Games by earning a medal in their respective State Games in the previous two years. Pallares was the men's singles gold medalist at the 2020 Commonwealth Games of Virginia (Virginia).

== Biography ==
Michael-Ray Pallares González is a second cousin once-removed of the Dominican Mirabal sisters. He was named after former professional basketball player Michael Ray Richardson.

Pallares' father played professional soccer in the Football League Second Division for Norwich City F.C.

== Junior career ==
As a junior, Michael-Ray was a two-time USTA National Champion winning the USTA National Interscholastic Championships in Lexington, Kentucky as well as the USTA National Port Washington Easter Classic at the famed Port Washington Tennis Academy in Port Washington, New York.

Past winners of these events include Jim Courier, John McEnroe, Butch Buchholz, Arthur Ashe, Roscoe Tanner, Harold Solomon, Bryan Shelton, Chris Woodruff, Luke Jensen, Brian Baker, and Donald Young amongst others.

== College career ==
Michael-Ray accepted an athletic scholarship to attend the University of Alabama in Tuscaloosa, Alabama where he played for the Alabama Crimson Tide men's tennis team which was ranked Top 10 in NCAA Division I Men's Tennis. In 2003, he was voted the Most Improved Player and was an instrumental part of the team that advanced to the NCAA Sweet 16 in Athens, Georgia. He graduated from the University of Alabama with a Bachelor of Business Administration.

== Professional career ==
=== ATP World Tour ===
Pallares González turned professional in 2004, competing predominantly on the ITF Men's Circuit and ATP Challenger Tour.

He's held an ATP ranking in singles & doubles for over ten years, posting wins over six players who were each ranked inside the ATP Top-300 and advanced to the doubles final of the $15K Algeria F3 Futures Tournament in 2011.

==== Doubles: (1 Runner-up) ====
Legend
ATP Challenger Tour (0–0)
ITF Futures (0–1)

Outcome	No.	Date	Tournament	Surface	Partner	Opponents	Score
Runner–up	1.	8 October 2011	Algeria F3 Algiers	Clay	(United States) Murphey Parker	(Austria) Lukas Jastraunig (Netherlands) Mark Vervoort	0–6, 6–7^{(3–7)}

=== Davis Cup ===
Michael-Ray Pallares González has represented the Dominican Republic as a member of four Davis Cup selections, posting a 1–0 record competing in the 2004 Davis Cup Americas Zone Groups II.

==== Davis Cup: Singles (1-0) ====
Edition	Round	Date	Surface	Opponent	W/L	Result
2004 Americas Zone Group II	Semifinal	11 April 2004	Hard (O)	(Uruguay) Federico Sansonetti	W	6–3, 6–3

=== European League Club Tennis ===
While playing European League Club Tennis for teams in Italy (TC Volpago), Germany (SV Blankenese e.V.), Austria (TC Grün Weiß Steyr) & (UTC Casa Moda Steyr), and France (Racing Club de France), Michael-Ray compiled a 57–13 record, helping his teams get promoted four times in their respective leagues.

==== European League Club Tennis: Record (57-13) ====
Season	Country	Club	League		
Season	Country	Club	League	Wins	Losses
2010	Germany	SV Blankenese	Oberliga Hamburg	10	2
2011	Germany	SV Blankenese	Oberliga Hamburg	12	0
2012	Germany	SV Blankenese	Oberliga Hamburg	3	1
2013	Germany	SV Blankenese	Regionalliga Nord	2	0
Total				27	3
2013	Austria	TC Grün Weiß Steyr	Landesliga	0	2
2014	Austria	TC Grün Weiß Steyr	Landesliga	4	0
2017	Austria	UTC Casa Moda Steyr	Bundesliga		
Total				4	2
2013	Italy	TC Volpago	Serie D1	4	0
2014	Italy	TC Volpago	Serie C	10	0
2015	Italy	TC Volpago	Serie C	8	0
2017	Italy	TC Volpago	Serie C		
Total				22	0
2014	France	Racing Club de France	Ligue 2	1	1
2015	France	Racing Club de France	Ligue 1	3	7
2017	France	Racing Club de France	Ligue 1		
Total				4	8
Career Total				57	13

=== USTA Tournaments ===
The United States Tennis Association Open Tournaments are the most competitive on the USTA schedule and provide a high level of competition and prize money for experienced players. Players of all abilities and ages can play in Open events, including former and current pros, teaching professionals, college players and top-ranked juniors.

In 2009, Pallares won the prestigious 83rd Annual National Public Parks Tennis Championships. The National Public Parks Tennis Association was founded by Dwight Davis and established the inaugural event in 1923.

Past winners of this event include Gardnar Mulloy, Seymour Greenberg, Fred Kovaleski, Noel Brown, Bill Tym, Steve Wilkinson, Ken Stuart, Larry Parker, Juan Farrow, and Carlos Gómez-Díaz amongst others.

While competing at the Men's Open Singles division, Michael-Ray achieved a #1 Final Ranking 12 times in 8 different sections. The USTA is made up of 17 individual sections, each representing distinct geographic locations throughout the United States.

Since 2021, the USTA Competition Committee approved changes to the Nationwide Competitive Structure, paving the way for a standardized nationwide structure and ranking system for tennis events across the 17 USTA Sections.

Michael-Ray was the #1 ranked player in the United States in the Men's Open Singles division for the years 2021 and 2022.

==== USTA Men's Open Singles: Sectional Rankings ====
Year	Ranking	Division	USTA Section	About
2002	3	Men's Open Singles	Florida	The USTA Florida section comprises the entire state of Florida.
2003	1	Men's Open Singles	Southern	The USTA Southern section includes the states of Alabama, Arkansas, Georgia, Kentucky, Louisiana, Mississippi, North Carolina, South Carolina and Tennessee.
2004	1	Men's Open Singles	Florida	The USTA Florida section comprises the entire state of Florida.
2009	1	Men's Open Singles	Southern	The USTA Southern section includes the states of Alabama, Arkansas, Georgia, Kentucky, Louisiana, Mississippi, North Carolina, South Carolina and Tennessee.
2011	1	Men's Open Singles	Midwest	The USTA Midwest section consists of the states of Illinois, Indiana, Michigan, Ohio and Wisconsin as well as designated counties in West Virginia and Kentucky.
2012	1	Men's Open Singles	Missouri Valley	The USTA Missouri Valley comprises the five-state area of Iowa, Kansas, Missouri, Nebraska and Oklahoma.
2013	1	Men's Open Singles	Southwest	The USTA Southwest section is made up of the states of Arizona, New Mexico and El Paso county in Texas.
2019	1	Men's Open Singles	New England	The USTA New England section consists of Massachusetts, Connecticut, Vermont, Rhode Island, New Hampshire and Maine.
2020	1	Men's Open Singles	Missouri Valley	The USTA Missouri Valley comprises the five-state area of Iowa, Kansas, Missouri, Nebraska and Oklahoma.
2021	1	Men's Open Singles	Florida	The USTA Florida section comprises the entire state of Florida.
2022	1	Men's Open Singles	Hawaii Pacific	The Hawaii Pacific Section embraces members in Hawaii, American Samoa, Guam and the Northern Marianas.
2023	1	Men's Open Singles	Southern	The USTA Southern section includes the states of Alabama, Arkansas, Georgia, Kentucky, Louisiana, Mississippi, North Carolina, South Carolina and Tennessee.
2024	1	Men's Open Singles	Texas	The USTA Texas section comprises the State of Texas, except El Paso and Bowie counties.

==== USTA Men's Open Singles: National Rankings ====
Year	Ranking	Division	USTA Section	About
2021	1	Men's Open Singles	National	The USTA comprises the United States, Puerto Rico, U.S. Virgin Islands, province of British Columbia, Guam, American Samoa, and the Commonwealth of the Northern Mariana Islands.
2022	1	Men's Open Singles	National	The USTA comprises the United States, Puerto Rico, U.S. Virgin Islands, province of British Columbia, Guam, American Samoa, and the Commonwealth of the Northern Mariana Islands.
2023	2	Men's Open Singles	National	The USTA comprises the United States, Puerto Rico, U.S. Virgin Islands, province of British Columbia, Guam, American Samoa, and the Commonwealth of the Northern Mariana Islands.
2024	2	Men's Open Singles	National	The USTA comprises the United States, Puerto Rico, U.S. Virgin Islands, province of British Columbia, Guam, American Samoa, and the Commonwealth of the Northern Mariana Islands.

== Coaching career ==
Michael-Ray Pallares González is the Owner & Head Professional of Crown Elite Tennis Academy, a high performance tennis academy specializing in junior development in Tampa, Florida.

He has served as Professional Tour Coach and/or hitting partner for several Top 10 ATP & WTA Players including Nicolas Almagro, John Isner, Maxime Janvier, Vera Zvonareva, Alla Kudryavtseva & Kristina Brandi.

He also served as Director of Tennis for the Panamanian Tennis Federation, Turkmenistan Tennis Federation and Guam National Tennis Federation as the International Tennis Federation Expert Coach undertaking the Development of National Sport Structure, creating an action plan to strengthen the tennis program approved by the NOC, International Olympic Committee and Olympic Solidarity.

== Philanthropy ==
Michael-Ray Pallares González founded One Love Tennis Inc. in 2011, which is a non-profit organization designed to reach underprivileged and low income youth through affordable tennis, education, and fitness. In 2019, the Professional Tennis Registry (PTR) named Michael-Ray the PTR Humanitarian of the Year at its annual awards week, during the PTR International Tennis Symposium. He has travelled all over the world, organizing Play-Day events designed to introduce kids to tennis providing them with the opportunity to continue to develop and enhance their skills. Play-Days are a welcoming way for kids to experience the social and competitive aspects of tennis, promoting a sense of achievement through a fun and spirited atmosphere.

=== Africa ===
In July 2016, Pallares González traveled to Southern Africa and teamed up with Jane Kaye-Bailey's Butterfly Tree Charity along with John Nomad's Nomad Sports Academy to conduct an Exhibition and Play-Day event for a group of 20 orphans from the Mukuni Village in Livingstone - Southern Province, Zambia.

Michael-Ray's second trip to the African continent came in May 2018, as he traveled to Ethiopia located in the Horn of Africa. He hosted a “Play-Day” event in collaboration with the Senai Foundation, for a group of 15 children from Hannah's Orphans Home in the heart of Addis Ababa, most of which have tragically lost their parents to either the HIV/AIDS epidemic or imprisonment of their parents.

Pallares González next visited the East African country of Zimbabwe in June 2018, to host a tennis academy “Stage & Clinic” for a group of 25 children from Mutasa Primary School in the Highfield township of Harare. The event was held at the historic Harare Sports Club in collaboration with the National Tennis Federation of Zimbabwe, the Zimbabwe Olympic Committee, and the Zimbabwe Sports & Recreation Commission.

That same month, Michael-Ray traveled to Rwanda, one of the smallest countries on the African mainland located in the Great Lakes Region of Central Africa. He collaborated with the Rwanda Tennis Federation and the Rwanda National Olympic and Sports Committee to host a training session for ten of the top juniors in the nation along with several national coaches to assist in further developing the sport of tennis in Rwanda, providing opportunities for young players and coaches to gain knowledge and have access to tennis supplies. The event took place during the final weekend of the Genocide Memorial Tennis Tournament at the National Training Center based out of the Stade National Amahoro in Kigali, Rwanda's capital and largest city.

=== Asia ===
In December 2015, North Okkalapa Township located in the eastern part of Yangon, Myanmar in southeast Asia was host to an event. The event was held at the Damayaketa Monastery for 25 children from the Myat Mingalar Orphanage.

In July 2024, One Love Tennis built its first tennis court specifically for at-risk adolescents in Guimbal, located in the province of Iloilo, Philippines. This was a significant accomplishment for One Love Tennis Foundation's, as the Guimbal court is a center for constructive growth rather than just a location to play tennis. Local kids can now learn the game in a safe environment when previously they had little to no access to sports facilities. According to Pallares, this opportunity can teach kids resilience, discipline, and determination, which can change their lives.

=== Australia and Oceania ===
In September 2018, in collaboration with the Guam National Tennis Federation and the Guam National Olympic Committee, Michael-Ray organized two events on the island of Guam, which is an unincorporated and organized territory of the United States in Micronesia in the western Pacific Ocean. It is the westernmost point and territory of the United States, along with the Northern Mariana Islands. The first Play-Day event was held for 20 girls and women in partnership with the Guaiya Todu Foundation, a non-profit organization striving to promote the sport of tennis to aspire and empower girls and women of all ages.

Pallares González then partnered with the Mañelu Foundation, a nonprofit institution that helps children reach their potential through professionally supported mentoring relationships, to host a Play-Day event for a group of 30 children.

=== Europe ===
In June 2017, Pallares González traveled to the Southern European island country of Malta and collaborated with the Salesian Pastoral Youth Service of the Salesians of Don Bosco and the Ursuline Sisters of the Ursulines to host a Play-Day event for a group of 15 children from the St Patrick's boys’ home in Sliema.

In September 2017, Michael-Ray once again travelled to Europe, this time to the Southeastern European country of Romania. The Play-Day event took place in the residential quarter of Moșilor located in Bucharest's Sector 2, Romania's capital and largest city. He partnered with the Saint Macrina Orphanage and the Romanian Churches Ecumenical Association to host the event for a group of 15 children living at the residential shelter.

In May 2018, Pallares González returned to Malta to host an exhibition and Play-Day event at the historic Marsa Sports Club for a group of 20 children from the St Patrick's boys’ home in Sliema.

=== North America ===
In December 2016, the Clayview Country Club in Kansas City, Missouri was the first site in the United States to host an event.

In October 2017, Michael-Ray collaborated with the Rockhurst University Men's & Women's Tennis Teams to host another event at historic Hyde Park, Kansas City. These Play-Day events were held for a group of 10 children who - by no fault of their own - were unable to remain in their homes and were placed in The Salvation Army Children's Shelter due to either a family crisis or child abuse, including issues of physical, sexual, emotional and psychological abuse, or severe neglect.

That same month, the Hanscom-Brandeis Indoor Tennis Center located within the historic Hanscom Park neighborhood in Midtown Omaha, Nebraska hosted an event for a group of 12 children from Completely KIDS, an organization that educates and assists youth and their families, via school and homeless shelter partnerships.

In July 2017, Michael-Ray's second event in the Midwest took place in Fargo, the most populous city in the state of North Dakota. The Play-Day event was held for a group of 12 children temporarily living at the YWCA Cass Clay Children's Emergency shelter.

In December 2017, Michael-Ray teamed-up with Fundación del Empresariado Sonorense (FESAC), the Border Community Alliance (BCA) and the Border Youth Tennis Exchange (BYTE) to host the first Play-Day event in Mexico. The event was held for a group of 45 children living at the Orfanato Casa de Elizabeth A.C. Children's Home in the municipal seat of Ímuris, located in the Imuris Municipality in the north of the Mexican state of Sonora.

==== Central America & Caribbean ====
In September 2017, Michael-Ray teamed-up with Fundación Sigue mis Pasos to host the first Play-Day event in his home country. The event was held for a group of 15 children living at the Orfanato Casa Amor y Restauración Hermosa Children's Home in the Brisas del Este sector of Santo Domingo Este, a municipality and provincial capital of the Santo Domingo province in the Dominican Republic.

That same month, he collaborated with Grupo Puntacana to host his second event in the Dominican Republic, this time for a group of 30 ball-boys at the Oscar de la Renta Tennis Center located in the Puntacana Resort and Club community of Punta Cana, La Altagracia Province.

In December 2018, Michael-Ray returned to the Orfanato Casa Amor y Restauración Hermosa Children's Home in the Brisas del Este sector of Santo Domingo Este, to donate tennis equipment to the shelter as well as take part in a special Christmas Dinner where more than 500 children from several nearby orphanages attended.

=== South America ===
In March 2016, Michael-Ray teamed-up with Tennis for Colombia to host a Play-Day event for a group of 10 ball-boys in the rural neighborhood of Puerto Caldas, a municipality of Pereira, Colombia in the foothills of the Andes located in northwest South America. In March 2017, his second event in Colombia took place in the town and municipality of Jamundí, (15 mi) south of Cali, the capital of the Valle del Cauca department, and the most populous city in southwest Colombia. The Play-Day event was held for a group of 8 ball-boys in collaboration with Las Mercedes Campestre Tennis Club.

=== Other Initiatives ===
==== Mental Health ====
In October 2017 and December 2018, Michael-Ray collaborated with occupational therapist Debbie Kolarik and recreational therapist Ron Tankel to organize an event and create a program for behavioral health clients at the New Frontiers tennis program at Truman Medical Center located in the Hospital Hill neighborhood of Kansas City, Missouri.

==== Child Literacy ====
In September 2018, Michael-Ray visited the St. John's School, an international college preparatory school located in the Tumon area of Tamuning, Guam, United States serving students from pre-kindergarten through 12th grade to celebrate and take part in National Reading Group Month. Pallares Gonzalez visited and read to St. John's 5th Grade Class and donated tennis equipment enabling students to familiarize themselves with the sport and further engage themselves in healthy competition amongst their peers.
