= Plugrà =

Brand of butter

Plugrà (formerly Plugrá until c. 2022) is a brand of butter made in the United States by Dairy Farmers of America. It is made with a higher butterfat content than most American butter (82% butterfat, vs. 80%.) The name "Plugra" is derived from the French plus gras ("more fat").
