= Oakhurst Dairy =

American dairy company

Coordinates: 43°39′50.0″N 70°16′26.1″W

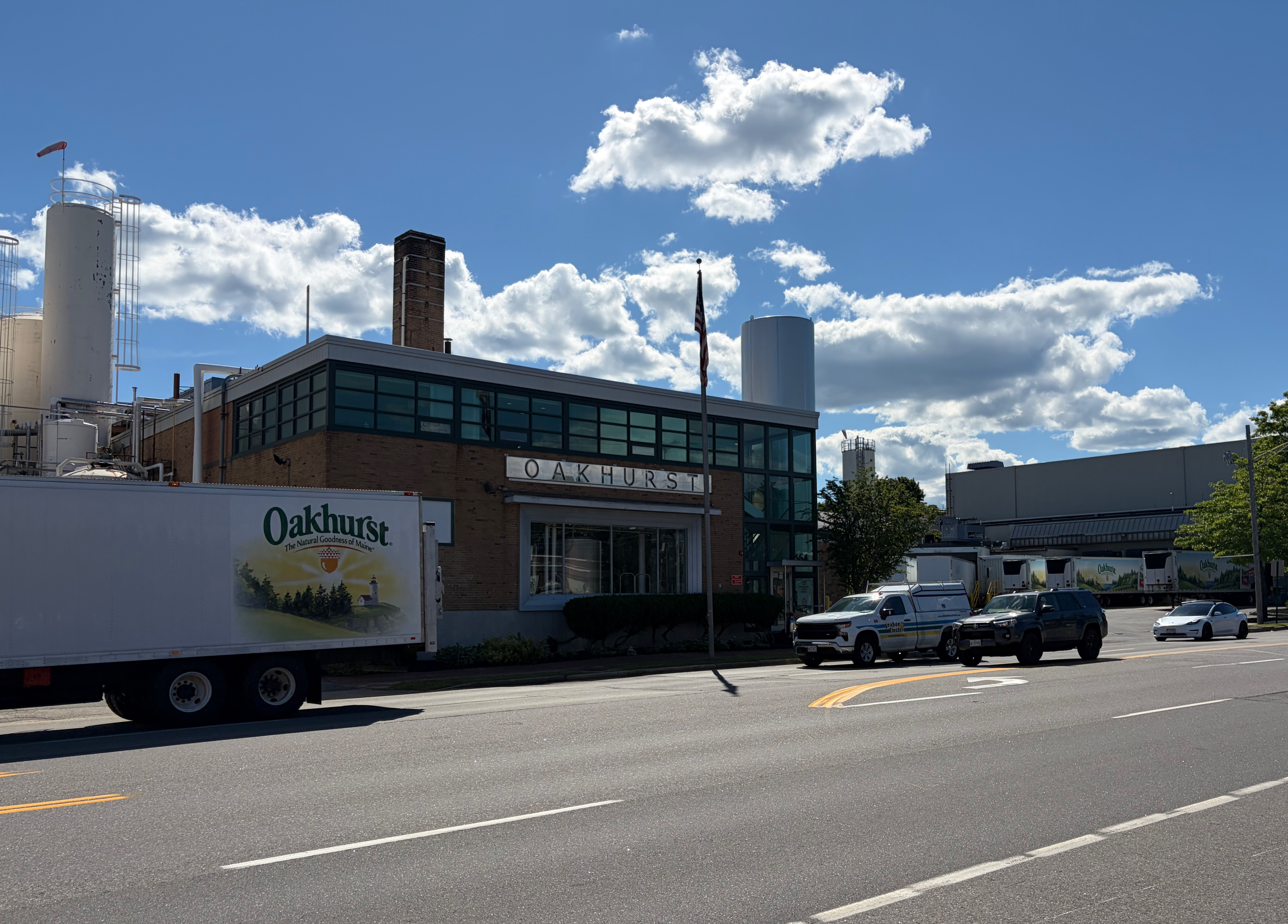
- Viewed from Congress Street (2026)
- Type: Subsidiary
- Industry: Dairy
- Genre: Milk
- Founded: 1918
- Founder: Arthur Leadbetter
- Headquarters: 364 Forest Avenue, Portland, Maine, U.S.
- Key people: Mark Page, president
- Products: Dairy products, juices
- Revenue: $ 110 million
- Number of employees: 200
- Parent: Dairy Farmers of America
- Website: oakhurstdairy.com

Oakhurst Dairy is a dairy company headquartered at 364 Forest Avenue in Portland, Maine, United States. It produces primarily dairy products as well as juices. Founded in 1918, it made headlines in 2003 when it was sued by agribusiness giant Monsanto over Oakhurst's label on its milk cartons that said "Our farmer's pledge: no artificial hormones," referring to the use of bovine somatotropin (rBST), a drug that increases milk production and that Monsanto sells. Monsanto argued that the label implied that Oakhurst milk was superior to milk from cows treated with rBST, which harmed Monsanto's business. Oakhurst was sold to Dairy Farmers of America, a national milk marketing cooperative based in Kansas City, Missouri in January 2014.

== History ==
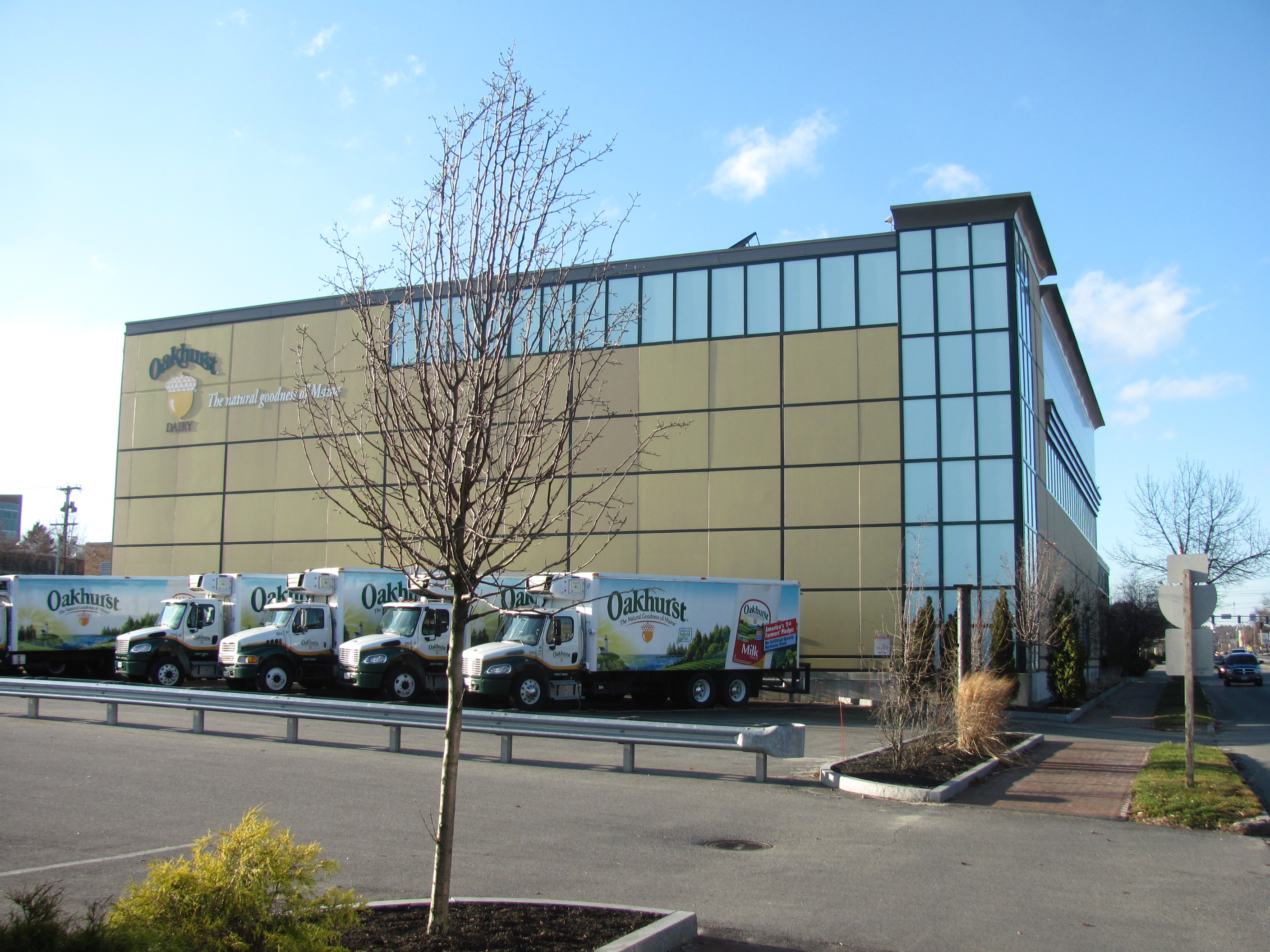
The expansion, pictured in 2011

The company's earliest predecessor was a dairy farm founded in 1902 by Arthur Leadbetter, located in Portland. The name was changed to Oakhurst in 1918, and in 1921 Stanley Bennett, who had been employed to manage the operation in 1920, bought the farm with financing from a local businessman, Nathan Cushman. At the time, Oakhurst delivered its milk via horse-drawn wagons over two routes. By 1923, the company had expanded to deliver milk over twelve routes and in 1929 there were 28 routes, including two dedicated to selling milk wholesale.

During its early years, Oakhurst focused on providing milk of higher quality than competing firms, and frequently inspected conditions at its farms and processing facilities. In 1933, Oakhurst began testing its milk for tuberculin, the first dairy in the US to do so.

By the 1940s, Oakhurst increasingly expanded its business of selling milk wholesale, to organizations such as IGA, A&P, regional schools and the Maine General Hospital. In 1941, Oakhurst came under the complete control of the Bennett family, who by that time owned all the company's stock. In 1954, Oakhurst completed an expansion of its processing plant, allowing it to produce up to 40,000 quarts of milk a day, a three-fold increase over its previous capacity.

In 1976, the company ended home delivery of milk, citing their inability to make a profit on the operation due to increasing costs. In 1977, Oakhurst bought Sanford Dairy, the first of several acquisitions of smaller dairies in the 1970s and 80s. In 1988, the company was faced with an antitrust lawsuit from Fitzpatrick Dairy, one such smaller company. In 1990, Oakhurst was ordered to pay $1.9 million to the Fitzpatrick's former owner.

In 2003, Oakhurst was faced with a lawsuit from Monsanto over Oakhurst's label on its milk cartons that said "Our farmer's pledge: no artificial hormones," referring to the use of bovine somatotropin (rBST), a drug that increases milk production and that Monsanto sells. Monsanto argued that the label implied that Oakhurst milk was superior to milk from cows treated with rBST, which harmed Monsanto's business. The two companies settled out of court, and it was announced that Oakhurst would add the word "used" at the end of its label, and note that the U.S. Food and Drug Administration claims there is no major difference between milk from rBST-treated and non rBST-treated cows. Oakhurst does not use rBST in its milk.

== See also ==
- Serial comma § Maine labor dispute
