= Kemps (company) =

American dairy company

- Type: Subsidiary
- Industry: Food
- Founded: 1914; 112 years ago, in Minneapolis, Minnesota, U.S.
- Founder: William Henry Kemps; W.S. Lathrop
- Headquarters: St. Louis Park, Minnesota, U.S.
- Area served: Midwestern United States
- Products: Dairy
- Number of employees: 1,125+
- Parent: Dairy Farmers of America
- Subsidiaries: Cass-Clay; Goodrich Ice Cream
- Website: kemps.com

Kemps LLC is an American dairy company in St. Louis Park, Minnesota. It has been a subsidiary of Dairy Farmers of America since being purchased in 2011 from HP Hood LLC. Dairy Farmers of America is based in Kansas City, Missouri, but Kemps continues to be headquartered in St. Louis Park. Products provided by the company include milk, cottage cheese, half and half, eggnog, cream, juices, sour cream, chip dips, ice cream, yogurt, and novelties. Most of the products are sold at grocery stores throughout the midwestern United States, however some are available in other parts of the country as well. Kemps operates five manufacturing facilities in Minnesota (3), Wisconsin (1), and Iowa.

== History ==
Kemps was founded in 1914 by William Henry Kemps (October 29, 1878 – October 2, 1964), formerly of St. Louis, Missouri, who partnered with W.S. Lathrop after Lathrop's Minneapolis candy company was near bankruptcy. The business was first known as Lathrop-Kemps Ice Cream Company, producing "special quality" Kemps Ice Cream. As part of the agreement, Lathrop had to maintain sobriety as he had problems with alcoholism. That did not happen, and Kemps soon became the sole owner of the company.

Kemps suffered from chronic health problems during his life. In 1921, a doctor advised that he may not be able to survive more than a few winters in Minnesota. Kemps and his family visited California later in 1921. Eventually they bought a home in Beverly Hills and moved there in 1924. At the same time, Kemps sold his company to competitor Crescent Creamery of Saint Paul, Minnesota. Brothers Arthur, Howard, and W.R. Cammack, who owned Crescent Creamery, operated both businesses as Kemps-Crescent.

In 1961, Kemps-Crescent merged with Marigold Dairies of Rochester, Minnesota, and Dolly Madison Dairies of Eau Claire, Wisconsin, to form Marigold Foods, Inc. The company merged with Ward Food Services of Maplewood, Minnesota, in 1968. In 1978, Dutch company NV Wessanen Koninklijke Fabrieken (now Royal Wessanen) bought Marigold Foods from Ward Food Services. National Dairy Holdings purchased Marigold Foods and its subsidiaries from Royal Wessanen in 2001, only to be acquired by HP Hood in 2004 in a deal also involving Crowley Foods of Binghamton, New York. Marigold Foods was renamed Kemps LLC in 2002 as most products provided by the company were of the Kemps brand. In 2011, the company was sold by HP Hood to Dairy Farmers of America.

== Acquisitions ==
Kemps has acquired numerous dairy companies to expand business, including:

- Clover Leaf Dairy Company of Minneapolis in 1979
- Fairmont Foods Company, Inc. of Green Bay, Wisconsin, in 1980 (dairy division only)
- Green's Ice Cream of York, Pennsylvania, in 1992
- Brown's Velvet Dairy of New Orleans in 1993 (sold to Suiza Foods in 2000 and acquired by Dean Foods in 2001)
- Cedarburg Dairy, Inc. of Cedarburg, Wisconsin, in 1993
- Hagan Ice Cream of Pittsburgh in 1996
- Becker's Dairy of Chicago in 1998
- Gillette Dairy, Inc. of Norfolk, Nebraska and Rapid City, South Dakota in 1999
- Goodrich Ice Cream of Omaha, Nebraska in 1999
- Oak Grove Dairy of Norwood, Minnesota in 2000
- Cass-Clay of Fargo, North Dakota in 2012

Cass-Clay and Goodrich Ice Cream are subsidiaries of Kemps. Green's Ice Cream and Hagan Ice Cream are subsidiaries under HP Hood and all other brands have been discontinued.

Kemps started a joint venture with Franklin Foods of Duluth, Minnesota, and Associated Milk Producers, Inc. in 1982, making products under the Arrowhead Dairy brand. Franklin Foods closed the plant in 2018.
