= Salesian Pastoral Youth Service =

Maltese Salesian team of religious and lay youth leaders

The Salesian Pastoral Youth Service (SPYS) is a Maltese Salesian team of religious and lay youth leaders that aims to develop and implement a programme of holistic formation for young people. The project started in 1995 by developing programmes with a target group in the local area of Sliema, Malta, and now operates nationally.

The group now also has involvement on a wider European scale as well as in developing countries through its international office, SPYS.int.

SPYS has been since 2004 also a member of the Don Bosco Youth-Net – a network of European Salesian organizations that provides training and support to young people.
