= Cass-Clay =

North Dakotan creamery

Cass-Clay Creamery
- Type: Subsidiary
- Industry: Food
- Founded: 1934; 92 years ago Moorhead, Minnesota, U.S.
- Headquarters: Fargo, North Dakota, U.S.
- Area served: Midwestern United States
- Products: Dairy
- Parent: Kemps
- Website: cassclay.com

Cass-Clay Creamery is a creamery headquartered in Fargo, North Dakota. It was founded in 1934 in neighboring Moorhead, Minnesota. Its present-day headquarters are at 200 20th St North in Fargo. It manufactures dairy products such as milk, cream, butter, sour cream, cottage cheese, yogurt and ice cream. It also manufactured dips and juices.

== History ==
In 1935 Cass-Clay Cooperative Creamery opened its first plant in Moorhead Minnesota

It is named for the neighboring counties of Cass, in North Dakota, and Clay, in Minnesota.

In 2007 it was acquired by Associated Milk Producers Inc. and in 2012 it was purchased by Kemps LLC
