= 2017 Keio Challenger – Men's singles =

Men's singles
- 2017 Keio Challenger

Final
- Champion: (Japan) Yūichi Sugita
- Runner-up: (South Korea) Kwon Soon-woo
- Score: 6–4, 2–6, 7–6^{(7–2)}

Events
Singles	men	women
Doubles	men	women
← 2015 ·	Keio Challenger	· 2018 →

Taro Daniel was the defending champion but chose not to defend his title.

Yūichi Sugita won the title after defeating Kwon Soon-woo 6–4, 2–6, 7–6^{(7–2)} in the final.

== Seeds ==
1. (Japan) Yūichi Sugita (champion)
2. (Switzerland) Henri Laaksonen (first round)
3. (South Korea) Lee Duck-hee (first round)
4. (Japan) Go Soeda (second round)
5. (Slovenia) Grega Žemlja (first round)
6. (Belgium) Ruben Bemelmans (second round)
7. (China) Zhang Ze (quarterfinals)
8. (Australia) Andrew Whittington (quarterfinals)

== Draw ==
=== Key ===
- Q = Qualifier
- WC = Wild card
- LL = Lucky loser
- Alt = Alternate
- ITF = ITF entry
- PR = Protected ranking
- SR = Special ranking
- SE = Special exempt
- JE = Junior exempt
- JR = Junior Accelerator Programme entrant
- CO = College Accelerator Programme entrant
- NG = Next Gen Accelerator Program entrant
- w/o = Walkover
- r = Retired
- d = Defaulted

=== Finals ===
Semifinals
1	(Japan) Yūichi Sugita	4	7^{8}	6
Q	(Australia) Blake Mott	6	6^{6}	2
(Japan) Tatsuma Ito	4	4
Q	(South Korea) Kwon Soon-woo	6	6

Final
1	(Japan) Yūichi Sugita	6	2	7^{7}
Q	(South Korea) Kwon Soon-woo	4	6	6^{2}

=== Top half ===
First round
1	(Japan) Y Sugita	6	6
(Argentina) A Velotti	4	4
(Australia) C O'Connell	1	7^{7}	3
(China) D Wu	6	6^{1}	6
(Slovenia) B Kavčič	4	6	6
(Australia) M Matosevic	6	0	4
WC	(Japan) Yo Watanuki	3	0
7	(China) Z Zhang	6	6
3	(South Korea) D-h Lee	5	7^{8}	1
(Serbia) M Tepavac	7	6^{6}	6
(Croatia) F Škugor	3	5
Q	(United Kingdom) B Klein	6	7
(Australia) M Polmans	4	7	6
PR	(Germany) C-M Stebe	6	5	0
Q	(Australia) B Mott	6	6
5	(Slovenia) G Žemlja	2	3

Second round
1	(Japan) Y Sugita	6	6
(China) D Wu	4	4
(Slovenia) B Kavčič	4	6^{5}
7	(China) Z Zhang	6	7^{7}
(Serbia) M Tepavac	3	4
Q	(United Kingdom) B Klein	6	6
(Australia) M Polmans	4	2
Q	(Australia) B Mott	6	6

Quarterfinals
1	(Japan) Y Sugita	6	6
7	(China) Z Zhang	2	1
Q	(United Kingdom) B Klein	4	1
Q	(Australia) B Mott	6	6

Semifinals
1	(Japan) Y Sugita	4	7^{8}	6
Q	(Australia) B Mott	6	6^{6}	2

=== Bottom half ===
First round
6	(Belgium) R Bemelmans	6	6
SE	(South Africa) L Harris	3	4
(Japan) Y Uchiyama	4	6	3
WC	(Japan) K Uesugi	6	1	6
(Belgium) J De Loore	6^{3}	1
(Japan) T Ito	7^{7}	6
(Japan) H Moriya	4	4
4	(Japan) G Soeda	6	6
8	(Australia) A Whittington	6^{5}	6	6
WC	(Japan) Sora Fukuda	7^{7}	4	2
Q	(Japan) T Niki	6	6
WC	(Japan) Masato Shiga	1	1
Q	(South Korea) S-w Kwon	6	7^{7}
(Chinese Taipei) J Jung	3	6^{2}
(China) Z Li	6	7^{7}
2	(Switzerland) H Laaksonen	3	6^{5}

Second round
6	(Belgium) R Bemelmans	4	6	3
WC	(Japan) K Uesugi	6	3	6
(Japan) T Ito	6	6
4	(Japan) G Soeda	4	1
8	(Australia) A Whittington	6	7^{7}
Q	(Japan) T Niki	4	6^{5}
Q	(South Korea) S-w Kwon	7^{7}	6
(China) Z Li	6^{5}	3

Quarterfinals
WC	(Japan) K Uesugi	7^{7}	2	6^{2}
(Japan) T Ito	6^{3}	6	7^{7}
8	(Australia) A Whittington	4	4
Q	(South Korea) S-w Kwon	6	6

Semifinals
(Japan) T Ito	4	4
Q	(South Korea) S-w Kwon	6	6
