= 2017 Keio Challenger – Men's doubles =

Men's doubles
- 2017 Keio Challenger

Final
- Champions: (Croatia) Marin Draganja (Croatia) Tomislav Draganja
- Runners-up: (Belgium) Joris De Loore (Australia) Luke Saville
- Score: 4–6, 6–3, [10–4]

Events
| Singles | men | women |
| Doubles | men | women |
| ← 2015 · | Keio Challenger | · 2018 → |

Sanchai and Sonchat Ratiwatana were the defending champions but only Sanchai Ratiwatana chose to defend his title, partnering Peng Hsien-yin. Ratiwatana lost in the first round to Masahiro Fukuda and Masamichi Imamura.

Marin and Tomislav Draganja won the title after defeating Joris De Loore and Luke Saville 4–6, 6–3, [10–4] in the final.

== Seeds ==
1. (China) Gong Maoxin / (China) Zhang Ze (semifinals)
2. (Chinese Taipei) Peng Hsien-yin / (Thailand) Sanchai Ratiwatana (first round)
3. (Australia) Alex Bolt / (Australia) Andrew Whittington (quarterfinals)
4. (China) Wu Di / (Chinese Taipei) Yi Chu-huan (first round)

== Draw ==
=== Key ===
- Q = Qualifier
- WC = Wild card
- LL = Lucky loser
- Alt = Alternate
- ITF = ITF entry
- PR = Protected ranking
- SR = Special ranking
- SE = Special exempt
- JE = Junior exempt
- JR = Junior Accelerator Programme entrant
- CO = College Accelerator Programme entrant
- NG = Next Gen Accelerator Program entrant
- w/o = Walkover
- r = Retired
- d = Defaulted

First round
1 | (China) M Gong (China) Z Zhang | 6 | 6
WC | (Japan) Nasa Hatakeyama (Japan) Kaito Itsusaki | 1 | 3
(Philippines) R Gonzales (Japan) T Matsui | 6^{5} | 6 | [7]
(Chinese Taipei) C-p Hsieh (Japan) H Moriya | 7^{7} | 4 | [10]
4 | (China) D Wu (Chinese Taipei) C-h Yi | 6 | 4 | [9]
(Croatia) M Draganja (Croatia) T Draganja | 4 | 6 | [11]
(Slovenia) B Rola (Slovenia) G Žemlja | 6^{2} | 6 | [7]
WC | (Japan) Yuki Mochizuki (Japan) Hiroki Yata | 7^{7} | 3 | [10]
Q | (South Korea) Han Sung-min (Japan) K Uesugi | 4 | 2
(Belgium) J De Loore (Australia) L Saville | 6 | 6
(United Kingdom) B Klein (Japan) Y Sugita | 3 | 3
3 | (Australia) A Bolt (Australia) A Whittington | 6 | 6
(South Korea) D-h Lee (South Africa) R Roelofse | 3 | 1
(Australia) S de Waard (New Zealand) B McLachlan | 6 | 6
WC | (Japan) Masahiro Fukuda (Japan) M Imamura | 2 | 7^{10} | [10]
2 | (Chinese Taipei) H-y Peng (Thailand) Sa Ratiwatana | 6 | 6^{8} | [5]

Quarterfinals
1 | (China) M Gong (China) Z Zhang | 7 | 6
(Chinese Taipei) C-p Hsieh (Japan) H Moriya | 5 | 2
(Croatia) M Draganja (Croatia) T Draganja | 7^{7} | 7
WC | (Japan) Y Mochizuki (Japan) H Yata | 6^{2} | 5
(Belgium) J De Loore (Australia) L Saville | 7^{7} | 6
3 | (Australia) A Bolt (Australia) A Whittington | 6^{5} | 3
(Australia) S de Waard (New Zealand) B McLachlan | 6 | 6
WC | (Japan) M Fukuda (Japan) M Imamura | 2 | 1

Semifinals
1 | (China) M Gong (China) Z Zhang | 3 | 6^{4}
(Croatia) M Draganja (Croatia) T Draganja | 6 | 7^{7}
(Belgium) J De Loore (Australia) L Saville | 6 | 6
(Australia) S de Waard (New Zealand) B McLachlan | 4 | 2

Final
(Croatia) M Draganja (Croatia) T Draganja | 4 | 6 | [10]
(Belgium) J De Loore (Australia) L Saville | 6 | 3 | [4]
