= 2014 Keio Challenger – Doubles =

Doubles
- 2014 Keio Challenger

Final
- Champions: (United States) Bradley Klahn (Australia) Matt Reid
- Runners-up: (New Zealand) Marcus Daniell (New Zealand) Artem Sitak
- Score: 4–6, 6–4, [10–7]

Events
Singles	Doubles
← 2013 ·	Keio Challenger	· 2015 →

Bradley Klahn and Michael Venus were the defending champions, however Venus chose not to participate. Klahn partnered with Matt Reid and won the title, defeating Marcus Daniell and Artem Sitak in the final, 4–6, 6–4, [10–7].

== Seeds ==
1. (New Zealand) Marcus Daniell / (New Zealand) Artem Sitak (final)
2. (Thailand) Sanchai Ratiwatana / (Thailand) Sonchat Ratiwatana (quarterfinals)
3. (China) Gong Maoxin / (Chinese Taipei) Peng Hsien-yin (semifinals)
4. (Chinese Taipei) Chen Ti / (Chinese Taipei) Huang Liang-chi (first round)

== Draw ==
=== Key ===
- Q = Qualifier
- WC = Wild card
- LL = Lucky loser
- Alt = Alternate
- ITF = ITF entry
- PR = Protected ranking
- SR = Special ranking
- SE = Special exempt
- JE = Junior exempt
- JR = Junior Accelerator Programme entrant
- CO = College Accelerator Programme entrant
- NG = Next Gen Accelerator Program entrant
- w/o = Walkover
- r = Retired
- d = Defaulted

First round
1	(New Zealand) M Daniell (New Zealand) A Sitak	6	6
WC	(Japan) Y Nishioka (Japan) K Uchida	3	1
(South Korea) H Chung (South Korea) J-s Nam	6	6
PR	(Australia) G Jones (Australia) J Thompson	4	2
4	(Chinese Taipei) T Chen (Chinese Taipei) L-c Huang	3	5
(Chinese Taipei) H-h Lee (Thailand) D Udomchoke	6	7
(China) Z Li (China) Z Zhang	6	6
(Russia) M Elgin (Russia) A Kudryavtsev	4	3
(Australia) A Hubble (Australia) J-P Smith	7^{7}	6
(India) Y Bhambri (Japan) H Moriya	6^{2}	3
WC	(Japan) Manato Tanimoto (Japan) K Uesugi	6^{5}	4
3	(China) M Gong (Chinese Taipei) H-y Peng	7^{7}	6
(United States) B Klahn (Australia) M Reid	6	4	[10]
(Japan) B Sato (Japan) G Soeda	3	6	[7]
WC	(Japan) Konosuke Kiryu (South Korea) Han Sung-min	1	0
2	(Thailand) Sa Ratiwatana (Thailand) So Ratiwatana	6	6

Quarterfinals
1	(New Zealand) M Daniell (New Zealand) A Sitak	6^{3}	7^{7}	[10]
(South Korea) H Chung (South Korea) J-s Nam	7^{7}	6^{4}	[3]
(Chinese Taipei) H-h Lee (Thailand) D Udomchoke	6^{4}	6	[10]
(China) Z Li (China) Z Zhang	7^{7}	4	[5]
(Australia) A Hubble (Australia) J-P Smith	6^{4}	1
3	(China) M Gong (Chinese Taipei) H-y Peng	7^{7}	6
(United States) B Klahn (Australia) M Reid	6	6
2	(Thailand) Sa Ratiwatana (Thailand) So Ratiwatana	4	1

Semifinals
1	(New Zealand) M Daniell (New Zealand) A Sitak	6	6
(Chinese Taipei) H-h Lee (Thailand) D Udomchoke	4	3
3	(China) M Gong (Chinese Taipei) H-y Peng	3	7^{7}	[7]
(United States) B Klahn (Australia) M Reid	6	6^{5}	[10]

Final
1	(New Zealand) M Daniell (New Zealand) A Sitak	6	4	[7]
(United States) B Klahn (Australia) M Reid	4	6	[10]

== Bibliography ==
- Main Draw
