= 2014 Keio Challenger – Singles =

Singles
- 2014 Keio Challenger

Final
- Champion: (Australia) John Millman
- Runner-up: (United Kingdom) Kyle Edmund
- Score: 6–4, 6–4

Events
Singles	Doubles
← 2013 ·	Keio Challenger	· 2015 →

Matthew Ebden was the defending champion but chose not to compete.

John Millman won the title, defeating Kyle Edmund in the final, 6–4, 6–4.

== Seeds ==
1. (Japan) Tatsuma Ito (quarterfinals)
2. (Japan) Go Soeda (semifinals)
3. (United States) Bradley Klahn (first round)
4. (Russia) Alexander Kudryavtsev (quarterfinals)
5. (Japan) Yūichi Sugita (first round)
6. (Japan) Hiroki Moriya (second round)
7. (Japan) Yoshihito Nishioka (quarterfinals)
8. (South Korea) Chung Hyeon (semifinals)

== Draw ==
=== Key ===
- Q = Qualifier
- WC = Wild card
- LL = Lucky loser
- Alt = Alternate
- ITF = ITF entry
- PR = Protected ranking
- SR = Special ranking
- SE = Special exempt
- JE = Junior exempt
- JR = Junior Accelerator Programme entrant
- CO = College Accelerator Programme entrant
- NG = Next Gen Accelerator Program entrant
- w/o = Walkover
- r = Retired
- d = Defaulted

=== Finals ===
Semifinals
8	(South Korea) Chung Hyeon	3	4
(Australia) John Millman	6	6
(United Kingdom) Kyle Edmund	4	6	6
2	(Japan) Go Soeda	6	1	3

Finals
(Australia) John Millman	6	6
(United Kingdom) Kyle Edmund	4	4

=== Top half ===
First round
1	(Japan) T Ito	6	6
(Thailand) D Udomchoke	3	2
(Japan) Yuuya Kibi	7^{7}	7
Q	(South Korea) J-s Nam	6^{4}	5
Q	(South Korea) Kim Young-seok	2	6	1
(Australia) J Thompson	6	3	6
Q	(Japan) Shuichi Sekiguchi	0	0
8	(South Korea) H Chung	6	6
4	(Russia) A Kudryavtsev	6	6
(Chinese Taipei) T Chen	4	4
WC	(Japan) Masato Shiga	6^{3}	3
(China) Z Li	7^{7}	6
WC	(Japan) K Uesugi	1	2
(Australia) J Millman	6	6
(Japan) T Niki	2	1
6	(Japan) H Moriya	6	6

Second round
1	(Japan) T Ito	6	6
(Japan) Y Kibi	4	4
(Australia) J Thompson	6^{5}	1
8	(South Korea) H Chung	7^{7}	6
4	(Russia) A Kudryavtsev	6	6
(China) Z Li	1	3
(Australia) J Millman	6	6
6	(Japan) H Moriya	3	3

Quarterfinals
1	(Japan) T Ito	4	2
8	(South Korea) H Chung	6	6
4	(Russia) A Kudryavtsev	3	2
(Australia) J Millman	6	6

Semifinals
8	(South Korea) H Chung	3	4
(Australia) J Millman	6	6

=== Bottom half ===
First round
5	(Japan) Y Sugita	2	3
(China) Z Zhang	6	6
LL	(South Korea) Kim Cheong-eui	6^{1}	1
PR	(Australia) G Jones	7^{7}	6
Q	(Japan) T Suzuki	3	2
WC	(Japan) K Uchida	6	6
(United Kingdom) K Edmund	6	3	6
3	(United States) B Klahn	2	6	1
7	(Japan) Y Nishioka	3	6	6
(Australia) M Reid	6	2	4
(Chinese Taipei) L-c Huang	2	0
(Australia) J-P Smith	6	6
(India) Y Bhambri	6	6
(United States) J Jung	3	2
WC	(Japan) Manato Tanimoto	3	1
2	(Japan) G Soeda	6	6

Second round
(China) Z Zhang	6	4	6
PR	(Australia) G Jones	1	6	1
WC	(Japan) K Uchida	5	3
(United Kingdom) K Edmund	7	6
7	(Japan) Y Nishioka	6	6
(Australia) J-P Smith	3	4
(India) Y Bhambri	1	2
2	(Japan) G Soeda	6	6

Quarterfinals
(China) Z Zhang	7	3	4
(United Kingdom) K Edmund	5	6	6
7	(Japan) Y Nishioka	2	2
2	(Japan) G Soeda	6	6

Semifinals
(United Kingdom) K Edmund	4	6	6
2	(Japan) G Soeda	6	1	3
