= 2019 Keio Challenger – Men's singles =

Men's singles
- 2019 Keio Challenger

Final
- Champion: (South Korea) Kwon Soon-woo
- Runner-up: (Germany) Oscar Otte
- Score: 7–6^{(7–4)}, 6–3

Events
| Singles | men | women |
| Doubles | men | women |
- Keio Challenger

Yasutaka Uchiyama was the defending champion but chose not to defend his title.

Kwon Soon-woo won the title after defeating Oscar Otte 7–6^{(7–4)}, 6–3 in the final.

== Seeds ==
All seeds receive a bye into the second round.

1. (Japan) Tatsuma Ito (third round)
2. (Germany) Oscar Otte (final)
3. (Japan) Yūichi Sugita (semifinals)
4. (Japan) Hiroki Moriya (second round)
5. (Germany) Mats Moraing (third round)
6. (Austria) Jurij Rodionov (third round)
7. (Japan) Go Soeda (third round)
8. (Israel) Dudi Sela (quarterfinals)
9. (Slovenia) Blaž Rola (third round)
10. (Italy) Gianluca Mager (quarterfinals)
11. (South Korea) Kwon Soon-woo (champion)
12. (Argentina) Pedro Cachin (second round)
13. (Brazil) Guilherme Clezar (second round)
14. (Canada) Filip Peliwo (third round)
15. (Serbia) Viktor Troicki (second round)
16. (France) Enzo Couacaud (second round)

== Draw ==
Key

- Q = Qualifier
- WC = Wild card
- LL = Lucky loser
- Alt = Alternate
- ITF = ITF entry
- PR = Protected ranking
- SR = Special ranking
- SE = Special exempt
- JE = Junior exempt
- JR = Junior Accelerator Programme entrant
- CO = College Accelerator Programme entrant
- NG = Next Gen Accelerator Program entrant
- w/o = Walkover
- r = Retired
- d = Defaulted

=== Finals ===
Quarterfinals
(South Korea) Lee Duck-hee | 1 | 0
11 | (South Korea) Kwon Soon-woo | 6 | 6
3 | (Japan) Yūichi Sugita | 2 | 6 | 7
8 | (Israel) Dudi Sela | 6 | 4 | 5
(Chinese Taipei) Yang Tsung-hua | 5 | 6^{4}
(Australia) Andrew Harris | 7 | 7^{7}
10 | (Italy) Gianluca Mager | 2 | 4
2 | (Germany) Oscar Otte | 6 | 6

Semifinals
11 | (South Korea) Kwon Soon-woo | 6 | 6
3 | (Japan) Yūichi Sugita | 3 | 2
(Australia) Andrew Harris | 3 | 4
2 | (Germany) Oscar Otte | 6 | 6

Final
11 | (South Korea) Kwon Soon-woo | 7^{7} | 6
2 | (Germany) Oscar Otte | 6^{4} | 3

=== Top half ===
==== Section 1 ====
First round
(Japan) Y Takahashi | 5 | 7 | 2
ITF | (Tunisia) M Echargui | 7 | 5 | 6
(South Korea) D-h Lee | 6 | 6
(China) Xia Zihao | 0 | 3
(Japan) Renta Tokuda | 5 | 2
WC | (Japan) M Imamura | 7 | 6
WC | (Japan) S Hazawa | 6^{2} | 4
(France) TK Wang | 7^{7} | 6

Second round
1 | (Japan) T Ito | 6 | 7
ITF | (Tunisia) M Echargui | 0 | 5
(South Korea) D-h Lee | 6 | 6
16 | (France) E Couacaud | 0 | 2
11 | (South Korea) S-w Kwon | 6 | 6
WC | (Japan) M Imamura | 2 | 2
(France) TK Wang | 6^{8} | 2
5 | (Germany) M Moraing | 7^{10} | 6

Third round
1 | (Japan) T Ito | 3 | 6 | 6^{7}
(South Korea) D-h Lee | 6 | 4 | 7^{9}
11 | (South Korea) S-w Kwon | 6 | 6
5 | (Germany) M Moraing | 2 | 4

Quarterfinals
(South Korea) D-h Lee | 1 | 0
11 | (South Korea) S-w Kwon | 6 | 6

==== Section 2 ====
First round
(Australia) B Ellis | 6 | 5 | 5
PR | (United States) D Nguyen | 3 | 7 | 7
(Portugal) G Oliveira | 3 | 6^{5}
ITF | (Russia) I Gakhov | 6 | 7^{7}
(Japan) K Uchida | 6 | 6
(United States) Roy Smith | 3 | 3
(Australia) L Saville | 2 | 6 | 6
WC | (Japan) K Uesugi | 6 | 4 | 2

Second round
3 | (Japan) Y Sugita | 2 | 6 | 7
PR | (United States) D Nguyen | 6 | 4 | 5
ITF | (Russia) I Gakhov | 2 | 4
14 | (Canada) F Peliwo | 6 | 6
9 | (Slovenia) B Rola | 7^{7} | 6
(Japan) K Uchida | 6^{3} | 4
(Australia) L Saville | 2 | 0
8 | (Israel) D Sela | 6 | 6

Third round
3 | (Japan) Y Sugita | 6 | 6
14 | (Canada) F Peliwo | 4 | 2
9 | (Slovenia) B Rola | 3 | 1
8 | (Israel) D Sela | 6 | 6

Quarterfinals
3 | (Japan) Y Sugita | 2 | 6 | 7
8 | (Israel) D Sela | 6 | 4 | 5

=== Bottom half ===
==== Section 3 ====
First round
LL | (Japan) Shintaro Imai | 2 | 3
ITF | (Spain) D Pérez Sanz | 6 | 6
(South Korea) Y-s Chung | 4 | 3
(Chinese Taipei) T-h Yang | 6 | 6
(China) D Wu | 4 | 6 | 2
(Portugal) G Elias | 6 | 3 | 6
(Australia) A Harris | 6 | 6
WC | (South Korea) Sung Yo-han | 1 | 2

Second round
6 | (Austria) J Rodionov | 7^{9} | 0 | 6
ITF | (Spain) D Pérez Sanz | 6^{7} | 6 | 4
(Chinese Taipei) T-h Yang | 6 | 6
12 | (Argentina) P Cachin | 4 | 4
13 | (Brazil) G Clezar | 6 | 2 | 6^{4}
(Portugal) G Elias | 0 | 6 | 7^{7}
(Australia) A Harris | 6 | 6
4 | (Japan) H Moriya | 3 | 3

Third round
6 | (Austria) J Rodionov | 4 | 4
(Chinese Taipei) T-h Yang | 6 | 6
(Portugal) G Elias | 4 | 7 | 4
(Australia) A Harris | 6 | 5 | 6

Quarterfinals
(Chinese Taipei) T-h Yang | 5 | 6^{4}
(Australia) A Harris | 7 | 7^{7}

==== Section 4 ====
First round
Q | (South Korea) Kim Cheong-eui | 6 | 6
WC | (Japan) Naoto Kai | 1 | 3
Q | (Chinese Taipei) C-h Tseng | 6 | 3 | 6
ITF | (Tunisia) S Mansouri | 4 | 6 | 3
(Australia) M Purcell | 6 | 6
(United States) K King | 2 | 2
(China) Y Bai | 6 | 0 | 7
(Japan) Makoto Ochi | 2 | 6 | 5

Second round
7 | (Japan) G Soeda | 6 | 6
Q | (South Korea) C-e Kim | 1 | 4
Q | (Chinese Taipei) C-h Tseng | 6^{3} | 6^{5}
10 | (Italy) G Mager | 7^{7} | 7^{7}
15 | (Serbia) V Troicki | 5 | 6^{5}
(Australia) M Purcell | 7 | 7^{7}
(China) Y Bai | 3 | 2
2 | (Germany) O Otte | 6 | 6

Third round
7 | (Japan) G Soeda | 6 | 5 | 5
10 | (Italy) G Mager | 3 | 7 | 7
(Australia) M Purcell | 6 | 5 | 4
2 | (Germany) O Otte | 1 | 7 | 6

Quarterfinals
10 | (Italy) G Mager | 2 | 4
2 | (Germany) O Otte | 6 | 6
