= 2018 Keio Challenger – Men's doubles =

Men's doubles
- 2018 Keio Challenger

Final
- Champions: (Germany) Tobias Kamke (Germany) Tim Pütz
- Runners-up: (Thailand) Sanchai Ratiwatana (Thailand) Sonchat Ratiwatana
- Score: 3–6, 7–5, [12–10]

Events
Singles	men	women
Doubles	men	women
← 2017 ·	Keio Challenger	· 2019 →

Marin and Tomislav Draganja were the defending champions but chose not to defend their title.

Tobias Kamke and Tim Pütz won the title after defeating Sanchai and Sonchat Ratiwatana 3–6, 7–5, [12–10] in the final.

== Seeds ==
1. (Thailand) Sanchai Ratiwatana / (Thailand) Sonchat Ratiwatana (final)
2. (India) Sriram Balaji / (Japan) Yasutaka Uchiyama (first round)
3. (Chinese Taipei) Peng Hsien-yin / (Sweden) Andreas Siljeström (quarterfinals)
4. (Japan) Toshihide Matsui / (Chinese Taipei) Yi Chu-huan (quarterfinals)

== Draw ==
=== Key ===
- Q = Qualifier
- WC = Wild card
- LL = Lucky loser
- Alt = Alternate
- SE = Special exempt
- PR = Protected ranking
- ITF = ITF entry
- JE = Junior exempt
- w/o = Walkover
- r = Retired
- d = Defaulted
- SR = Special ranking

First round
1	(Thailand) Sa Ratiwatana (Thailand) So Ratiwatana	6	6
WC	(Japan) S Hazawa (Japan) M Imamura	3	4
(China) Z Li (France) S Robert	6	4	[0]
(Australia) M Purcell (Australia) A Whittington	3	6	[10]
4	(Japan) T Matsui (Chinese Taipei) C-h Yi	6	2
Q	(Italy) M Donati (Israel) E Leshem	1	1^{r}
WC	(Japan) T Ito (Japan) K Uesugi	6	6
WC	(Japan) Masahiro Fukuda (Japan) Eiji Yamasaki	2	3
(Turkey) T Altuna (Poland) H Hurkacz	4	2
(Indonesia) C Rungkat (China) Ze Zhang	6	6
(United Kingdom) B Klein (Switzerland) L Margaroli	7^{7}	6^{5}	[6]
3	(Chinese Taipei) H-y Peng (Sweden) A Siljeström	6^{2}	7^{7}	[10]
(China) M Gong (Chinese Taipei) C-p Hsieh	6	7^{7}
(Chinese Taipei) T Chen (Chinese Taipei) J Jung	3	6^{5}
(Germany) T Kamke (Germany) T Pütz	6	6
2	(India) S Balaji (Japan) Y Uchiyama	4	3

Quarterfinals
1	(Thailand) Sa Ratiwatana (Thailand) So Ratiwatana	6	7
(Australia) M Purcell (Australia) A Whittington	3	5
4	(Japan) T Matsui (Chinese Taipei) C-h Yi	7^{9}	5	[8]
WC	(Japan) T Ito (Japan) K Uesugi	6^{7}	7	[10]
(Indonesia) C Rungkat (China) Ze Zhang	6	6
3	(Chinese Taipei) H-y Peng (Sweden) A Siljeström	2	2
(China) M Gong (Chinese Taipei) C-p Hsieh	6^{1}	6^{3}
(Germany) T Kamke (Germany) T Pütz	7^{7}	7^{7}

Semifinals
1	(Thailand) Sa Ratiwatana (Thailand) So Ratiwatana	5	6	[10]
WC	(Japan) T Ito (Japan) K Uesugi	7	2	[6]
(Indonesia) C Rungkat (China) Ze Zhang	3	3
(Germany) T Kamke (Germany) T Pütz	6	6

Final
1	(Thailand) Sa Ratiwatana (Thailand) So Ratiwatana	6	5	[10]
(Germany) T Kamke (Germany) T Pütz	3	7	[12]
