= 2013 Keio Challenger – Singles =

Singles
- 2013 Keio Challenger

Final
- Champion: (Australia) Matthew Ebden
- Runner-up: (Japan) Go Soeda
- Score: 2–6, 7–6^{(7–3)}, 6–3

Events
Singles	Doubles
← 2012 ·	Keio Challenger	· 2014 →

Matteo Viola was the defending champion but chose not to compete. Matthew Ebden won his third Challenger of the year over Japan's Go Soeda.

== Seeds ==
1. (Australia) Matthew Ebden (champion)
2. (Slovenia) Blaž Kavčič (second round, withdrew)
3. (Japan) Go Soeda (final)
4. (United States) Bradley Klahn (semifinals)
5. (Australia) James Duckworth (first round)
6. (France) Pierre-Hugues Herbert (semifinals)
7. (Japan) Yūichi Sugita (first round, retired)
8. (Japan) Tatsuma Ito (quarterfinals)

== Draw ==
=== Key ===
- Q = Qualifier
- WC = Wild card
- LL = Lucky loser
- Alt = Alternate
- ITF = ITF entry
- PR = Protected ranking
- SR = Special ranking
- SE = Special exempt
- JE = Junior exempt
- JR = Junior Accelerator Programme entrant
- CO = College Accelerator Programme entrant
- NG = Next Gen Accelerator Program entrant
- w/o = Walkover
- r = Retired
- d = Defaulted

=== Finals ===
Semifinals
1	(Australia) Matthew Ebden	6	6
4	(United States) Bradley Klahn	3	1
3	(Japan) Go Soeda	6	6
6	(France) Pierre-Hugues Herbert	4	4

Final
1	(Australia) Matthew Ebden	2	7^{7}	6
3	(Japan) Go Soeda	6	6^{3}	3

=== Top half ===
First round
1	(Australia) M Ebden	6	3	6
(Bosnia and Herzegovina) M Bašić	0	6	2
(Japan) H Moriya	6	6
(Australia) M Reid	3	2
(Slovenia) B Rola	6^{4}	4
(Australia) B Mitchell	7^{7}	6
(Chinese Taipei) J Wang	6	3
7	(Japan) Y Sugita	4	1^{r}
4	(United States) B Klahn	6	6
(Chinese Taipei) L-C Huang	1	3
(China) D Wu	6	5	6
(Republic of Ireland) J McGee	3	7	2
PR	(United States) D Kosakowski	2	1
Q	(South Korea) H Chung	6	6
(Japan) T Daniel	5	3
8	(Japan) T Ito	7	6

Second round
1	(Australia) M Ebden	6	6
(Japan) H Moriya	1	3
(Australia) B Mitchell	6^{2}	0
(Chinese Taipei) J Wang	7^{7}	6
4	(United States) B Klahn	6	7
(China) D Wu	1	5
Q	(South Korea) H Chung	2	3
8	(Japan) T Ito	6	6

Quarterfinals
1	(Australia) M Ebden	6	6
(Chinese Taipei) J Wang	4	4
4	(United States) B Klahn	4	6	6
8	(Japan) T Ito	6	3	4

Semifinals
1	(Australia) M Ebden	6	6
4	(United States) B Klahn	3	1

=== Bottom half ===
First round
5	(Australia) J Duckworth	3	5
(Belgium) K Coppejans	6	7
(Switzerland) M Chiudinelli	6	7
Q	(Japan) Y Uchiyama	4	5
WC	(Japan) Masato Shiga	6	4	2
Q	(United States) C Buchanan	3	6	6
WC	(Japan) K Uchida	2	4
3	(Japan) G Soeda	6	6
6	(France) P-H Herbert	6	6
WC	(Japan) Y Nishioka	3	2
(Spain) E López-Pérez	4	6	6
Q	(Japan) Shuichi Sekiguchi	6	4	2
(Belgium) G Gigounon	2	2
WC	(Croatia) B Ćorić	6	6
(United Kingdom) J Ward	4	1
2	(Slovenia) B Kavčič	6	6

Second round
(Belgium) K Coppejans	6	1	2
(Switzerland) M Chiudinelli	4	6	6
Q	(United States) C Buchanan	1	1
3	(Japan) G Soeda	6	6
6	(France) P-H Herbert	7^{7}	6
(Spain) E López-Pérez	6^{5}	4
WC	(Croatia) B Ćorić	w/o
2	(Slovenia) B Kavčič

Quarterfinals
(Switzerland) M Chiudinelli	4	4
3	(Japan) G Soeda	6	6
6	(France) P-H Herbert	2	6	7^{9}
WC	(Croatia) B Ćorić	6	3	6^{7}

Semifinals
3	(Japan) G Soeda	6	6
6	(France) P-H Herbert	4	4
