= 2013 Keio Challenger – Doubles =

Doubles
- 2013 Keio Challenger

Final
- Champions: (United States) Bradley Klahn (New Zealand) Michael Venus
- Runners-up: (Thailand) Sanchai Ratiwatana (Thailand) Sonchat Ratiwatana
- Score: 7–5, 6–1

Events
Singles	Doubles
← 2012 ·	Keio Challenger	· 2014 →

Prakash Amritraj and Philipp Oswald were the defending champions but chose not to compete.
Bradley Klahn and Michael Venus defeated second seeds Sanchai Ratiwatana and Sonchat Ratiwatana 7–5, 6–1.

== Seeds ==
1. (Croatia) Marin Draganja / (Croatia) Mate Pavić (first round)
2. (Thailand) Sanchai Ratiwatana / (Thailand) Sonchat Ratiwatana (final)
3. (Germany) Frank Moser / (Australia) Matt Reid (first round)
4. (United States) James Cerretani / (Canada) Adil Shamasdin (first round)

== Draw ==
=== Key ===
- Q = Qualifier
- WC = Wild card
- LL = Lucky loser
- Alt = Alternate
- ITF = ITF entry
- PR = Protected ranking
- SR = Special ranking
- SE = Special exempt
- JE = Junior exempt
- JR = Junior Accelerator Programme entrant
- CO = College Accelerator Programme entrant
- NG = Next Gen Accelerator Program entrant
- w/o = Walkover
- r = Retired
- d = Defaulted

=== Draw ===
First round
1	(Croatia) M Draganja (Croatia) M Pavić	3	6^{10}
Alt	(Japan) T Matsui (Thailand) D Udomchoke	6	7^{12}
(Chinese Taipei) T Chen (Spain) E López-Pérez	6	7
WC	(Japan) Koki Takada (Japan) Takashi Yano	1	5
3	(Germany) F Moser (Australia) M Reid	3	2
(United States) C Buchanan (Slovenia) B Rola	6	6
(United Kingdom) B Klein (Chinese Taipei) T-h Yang	3	4
(United States) B Klahn (New Zealand) M Venus	6	6
WC	(Japan) Yoshifumi Inoue (South Korea) Kweon Dae-yang	3	6^{4}
(Chinese Taipei) H-h Lee (Chinese Taipei) H-y Peng	6	7^{7}
(Philippines) R Gonzales (New Zealand) A Sitak	6	6
4	(United States) J Cerretani (Canada) A Shamasdin	0	1
WC	(Japan) T Ito (Japan) Y Uchiyama	6	6
(Bosnia and Herzegovina) M Bašić (Belgium) G Gigounon	1	1
PR	(United States) D Kosakowski (Chinese Taipei) J Wang	2	6^{5}
2	(Thailand) Sa Ratiwatana (Thailand) So Ratiwatana	6	7^{7}

Quarterfinals
Alt	(Japan) T Matsui (Thailand) D Udomchoke	6	3	[9]
(Chinese Taipei) T Chen (Spain) E López-Pérez	3	6	[11]
(United States) C Buchanan (Slovenia) B Rola	6	4	[8]
(United States) B Klahn (New Zealand) M Venus	4	7	[10]
(Chinese Taipei) H-h Lee (Chinese Taipei) H-y Peng	4	3
(Philippines) R Gonzales (New Zealand) A Sitak	6	6
WC	(Japan) T Ito (Japan) Y Uchiyama	5	6^{2}
2	(Thailand) Sa Ratiwatana (Thailand) So Ratiwatana	7	7^{7}

Semifinals
(Chinese Taipei) T Chen (Spain) E López-Pérez	3	6^{3}
(United States) B Klahn (New Zealand) M Venus	6	7^{7}
(Philippines) R Gonzales (New Zealand) A Sitak	2	2
2	(Thailand) Sa Ratiwatana (Thailand) So Ratiwatana	6	6

Final
(United States) B Klahn (New Zealand) M Venus	7	6
2	(Thailand) Sa Ratiwatana (Thailand) So Ratiwatana	5	1
