= 2019 Keio Challenger =

- Date: 25 February – 3 March (men's); 4 – 10 March (women's)
- Edition: 14th (men's); 3rd (women's)
- Category: ATP Challenger Tour; ITF Women's World Tennis Tour
- Surface: Hard
- Location: Yokohama, Japan

Champions

Men's singles
- (South Korea) Kwon Soon-woo

Women's singles
- (Belgium) Greet Minnen

Men's doubles
- (Tunisia) Moez Echargui / (Tunisia) Skander Mansouri

Women's doubles
- (South Korea) Choi Ji-hee / (South Korea) Han Na-lae
← 2018 ·	Keio Challenger	· 2022 →

The 2019 Keio Challenger was a professional tennis tournament played on hardcourts. It was the 14th (men's) and third (women's) editions of the tournament and part of the 2019 ATP Challenger Tour and the 2019 ITF Women's World Tennis Tour. It took place in Yokohama, Japan between 25 February and 10 March 2019.

== Men's singles main-draw entrants ==
=== Seeds ===
Country	Player	Rank^{1}	Seed
JPN	Tatsuma Ito	132	1
GER	Oscar Otte	156	2
JPN	Yūichi Sugita	160	3
JPN	Hiroki Moriya	177	4
GER	Mats Moraing	184	5
AUT	Jurij Rodionov	191	6
JPN	Go Soeda	194	7
ISR	Dudi Sela	195	8
SLO	Blaž Rola	201	9
ITA	Gianluca Mager	213	10
KOR	Kwon Soon-woo	225	11
ARG	Pedro Cachin	235	12
BRA	Guilherme Clezar	237	13
CAN	Filip Peliwo	238	14
SRB	Viktor Troicki	243	15
FRA	Enzo Couacaud	249	16

- ^{1} rankings are as of 18 February 2019

=== Other entrants ===
The following players received wildcards into the singles main draw:

- (Japan) Shinji Hazawa
- (Japan) Masamichi Imamura
- (Japan) Naoto Kai
- (South Korea) Sung Yo-han
- (Japan) Kaito Uesugi

The following player received entry into the singles main draw using a protected ranking:

- (United States) Daniel Nguyen

The following players received entry into the singles main draw using their ITF World Tennis ranking:

- (Tunisia) Moez Echargui
- (Russia) Ivan Gakhov
- (Tunisia) Skander Mansouri
- (Spain) David Pérez Sanz

The following players received entry from the qualifying draw:

- (South Korea) Kim Cheong-eui
- (Chinese Taipei) Tseng Chun-hsin

The following player received entry as a lucky loser:

- (Japan) Shintaro Imai

== Women's singles main-draw entrants ==
=== Seeds ===
Country	Player	Rank^{1}	Seed
SRB	Ivana Jorović	108	1
CHN	Liu Fangzhou	173	2
SVK	Rebecca Šramková	182	3
SUI	Ylena In-Albon	183	4
CHN	Lu Jiajing	186	5
SRB	Dejana Radanović	195	6
KOR	Han Na-lae	199	7
JPN	Ayano Shimizu	206	8

- ^{1} rankings are as of 25 February 2019.

=== Other entrants ===
The following players received wildcards into the singles main draw:

- (Japan) Ayumi Hirata
- (Japan) Anri Nagata
- (Japan) Risa Ozaki
- (Japan) Satoko Sueno

The following players received entry into the singles main draw using their ITF World Tennis ranking:

- (Chinese Taipei) Lee Hua-chen
- (Thailand) Nudnida Luangnam
- (Russia) Anna Morgina
- (Japan) Naho Sato
- (Russia) Anna Ureke

The following players received entry from the qualifying draw:

- (Japan) Mayuka Aikawa
- (Japan) Shiho Akita
- (United States) Catherine Harrison
- (Japan) Kyōka Okamura
- (Japan) Akiko Omae
- (Japan) Risa Ushijima

== Champions ==
=== Men's singles ===
- (South Korea) Kwon Soon-woo def. (Germany) Oscar Otte 7–6^{(7–4)}, 6–3.

=== Women's singles ===
- (Belgium) Greet Minnen def. (Romania) Elena-Gabriela Ruse, 6–4, 6–1

=== Men's doubles ===
- (Tunisia) Moez Echargui / (Tunisia) Skander Mansouri def. (Australia) Max Purcell / (Australia) Luke Saville 7–6^{(8–6)}, 6–7^{(3–7)}, [10–7].

=== Women's doubles ===
- (South Korea) Choi Ji-hee / (South Korea) Han Na-lae def. (India) Rutuja Bhosale / (Japan) Akiko Omae, 6–1, 7–5
