= 2012 Keio Challenger – Singles =

Singles
- 2012 Keio Challenger

Final
- Champion: (Italy) Matteo Viola
- Runner-up: (Bosnia and Herzegovina) Mirza Bašić
- Score: 7–6^{(7–3)}, 6–3

Events
Singles	Doubles
← 2011 ·	Keio Challenger	· 2013 →

Takao Suzuki was the champion in 2009.
Matteo Viola won the title by defeating Mirza Bašić 7–6^{(7–3)}, 6–3 in the final.

== Seeds ==
1. (Japan) Tatsuma Ito (second round)
2. (United States) Rajeev Ram (quarterfinals)
3. (Japan) Yuichi Sugita (semifinals)
4. (Italy) Matteo Viola (champion)
5. (Japan) Hiroki Moriya (quarterfinals)
6. (Chinese Taipei) Chen Ti (first round)
7. (United Kingdom) Jamie Baker (second round)
8. (Australia) Brydan Klein (first round)

== Draw ==
=== Key ===
- Q = Qualifier
- WC = Wild card
- LL = Lucky loser
- Alt = Alternate
- SE = Special exempt
- PR = Protected ranking
- ITF = ITF entry
- JE = Junior exempt
- w/o = Walkover
- r = Retired
- d = Defaulted
- SR = Special ranking

=== Finals ===
Semifinals
(Japan) Taro Daniel	0	4
4	(Italy) Matteo Viola	6	6
3	(Japan) Yuichi Sugita	4	0
(Bosnia and Herzegovina) Mirza Bašić	6	6

Final
4	(Italy) Matteo Viola	7^{7}	6
(Bosnia and Herzegovina) Mirza Bašić	6^{3}	3

=== Top half ===
First round
1	(Japan) T Ito	6	3	7^{7}
(Australia) J Millman	4	6	6^{3}
(Japan) Taro Daniel	6	6
(France) Julien Obry	0	3
(Italy) Andrea Arnaboldi	6	4
(Japan) Y Uchiyama	1	0^{r}
(Australia) M Reid	6	2	2
7	(United Kingdom) J Baker	4	6	6
4	(Italy) M Viola	4	6	6
(Switzerland) H Laaksonen	6	3	4
Q	(Japan) Y Ito	3	6	3
(Australia) B Mitchell	6	3	6
WC	(Japan) Masato Shiga	5	2
(Russia) A Kudryavtsev	7	6
(Chinese Taipei) Huang L-c	6	7^{7}
8	(Australia) B Klein	3	6^{2}

Second round
1	(Japan) T Ito	3	1
(Japan) T Daniel	6	6
(Italy) A Arnaboldi	3	6	7
7	(United Kingdom) J Baker	6	1	5
4	(Italy) M Viola	6	4	7
(Australia) B Mitchell	3	6	5
(Russia) A Kudryavtsev	4	6^{3}
(Chinese Taipei) Huang L-c	6	7^{7}

Quarterfinals
(Japan) T Daniel	6	6
(Italy) A Arnaboldi	2	3
4	(Italy) M Viola	6	6
(Chinese Taipei) Huang L-c	3	0

Semifinals
(Japan) T Daniel	0	4
4	(Italy) M Viola	6	6

=== Bottom half ===
First round
5	(Japan) H Moriya	6	6
WC	(Japan) Yoshihito Nishioka	2	0
WC	(Japan) T Matsui	2	6^{3}
PR	(India) P Amritraj	6	7^{7}
(Austria) P Oswald	2	4
(Republic of Ireland) J McGee	6	6
Q	(Japan) Yuuya Kibi	1	2
3	(Japan) Y Sugita	6	6
6	(Chinese Taipei) T Chen	4	6	4
Q	(Japan) Shuichi Sekiguchi	6	4	6
(New Zealand) D King-Turner	2	6	6^{5}
(Bosnia and Herzegovina) M Bašić	6	1	7^{7}
Q	(New Zealand) M Venus	6^{5}	3
(Indonesia) C Rungkat	7^{7}	6
WC	(Japan) K Uchida	6	3	6^{4}
2	(United States) R Ram	4	6	7^{7}

Second round
5	(Japan) H Moriya	7^{7}	3	6
PR	(India) P Amritraj	6^{3}	6	0
(Republic of Ireland) J McGee	2	5
3	(Japan) Y Sugita	6	7
Q	(Japan) S Sekiguchi	6^{2}	2
(Bosnia and Herzegovina) M Bašić	7^{7}	6
(Indonesia) C Rungkat	2	4
2	(United States) R Ram	6	6

Quarterfinals
5	(Japan) H Moriya	3	2
3	(Japan) Y Sugita	6	6
(Bosnia and Herzegovina) M Bašić	6	3	6
2	(United States) R Ram	4	6	1

Semifinals
3	(Japan) Y Sugita	4	0
(Bosnia and Herzegovina) M Bašić	6	6
