= 2017 Keio Challenger =

- Date: 27 February – 5 March (ATP); 6 – 12 March (ITF)
- Edition: 12th (ATP); 1st (ITF)
- Category: ATP Challenger Tour; ITF Women's Circuit
- Prize money: $50,000+H (ATP) $25,000 (ITF)
- Surface: Hard
- Location: Yokohama, Japan

Champions

Men's singles
- (Japan) Yūichi Sugita

Women's singles
- (Japan) Akiko Omae

Men's doubles
- (Croatia) Marin Draganja / (Croatia) Tomislav Draganja

Women's doubles
- (Japan) Ayaka Okuno / (Japan) Erika Sema
← 2015 ·	Keio Challenger	· 2018 →

The 2017 Keio Challenger was a professional tennis tournament played on hard courts. It was the twelfth (ATP) and first (ITF) editions of the tournament and part of the 2017 ATP Challenger Tour and the 2017 ITF Women's Circuit. The tournament offered $50,000+H in prize money for the men and $25,000 prize money for the women. It took place in Yokohama, Japan between 27 February and 5 March 2017 for the men's edition and between 6 and 12 March 2017 for the women's.

== Men's singles main-draw entrants ==
=== Seeds ===
Country	Player	Rank^{1}	Seed
JPN	Yūichi Sugita	114	1
SUI	Henri Laaksonen	122	2
KOR	Lee Duck-hee	135	3
JPN	Go Soeda	136	4
SLO	Grega Žemlja	150	5
BEL	Ruben Bemelmans	152	6
CHN	Zhang Ze	157	7
AUS	Andrew Whittington	164	8

- ^{1} Rankings are as of February 20, 2017.

=== Other entrants ===
The following players received wildcards into the singles main draw:

- (Japan) Sora Fukuda
- (Japan) Masato Shiga
- (Japan) Kaito Uesugi
- (Japan) Yosuke Watanuki

The following player received entry into the singles main using a protected ranking:

- (Germany) Cedrik-Marcel Stebe

The following player received entry into the singles main draw as a special exemption:

- (South Africa) Lloyd Harris

The following players received entry from the qualifying draw:

- (United Kingdom) Brydan Klein
- (South Korea) Kwon Soon-woo
- (Australia) Blake Mott
- (Japan) Takuto Niki

== Women's singles main-draw entrants ==
=== Seeds ===
Country	Player	Rank^{1}	Seed
JPN	Miyu Kato	201	1
GBR	Laura Robson	207	2
JPN	Akiko Omae	229	3
JPN	Mayo Hibi	230	4
JPN	Shiho Akita	246	5
JPN	Junri Namigata	256	6
KAZ	Galina Voskoboeva	257	7
JPN	Kyōka Okamura	259	8

- ^{1} Rankings are as of February 27, 2017.

=== Other entrants ===
The following players received wildcards into the singles main draw:

- (Japan) Sumina Eshiro
- (Japan) Hayaka Murase
- (Japan) Megumi Nishimoto
- (Japan) Suzuho Oshino

The following players received entry from the qualifying draw:

- (Japan) Haruna Arakawa
- (Japan) Erina Hayashi
- (Japan) Miyabi Inoue
- (Japan) Haruka Kaji
- (Japan) Rio Kitagawa
- (Japan) Mai Minokoshi
- (Japan) Ramu Ueda
- (Japan) Aki Yamasoto

== Champions ==
=== Men's singles ===
- (Japan) Yūichi Sugita def. (South Korea) Kwon Soon-woo 6–4, 2–6, 7–6^{(7–2)}.

=== Women's singles ===
- (Japan) Akiko Omae def. (Japan) Mayo Hibi 7–5, 6–2.

=== Men's doubles ===
- (Croatia) Marin Draganja / (Croatia) Tomislav Draganja def. (Belgium) Joris De Loore / (Australia) Luke Saville 4–6, 6–3, [10–4].

=== Women's doubles ===
- (Japan) Ayaka Okuno / (Japan) Erika Sema def. (Japan) Kanako Morisaki / (Japan) Minori Yonehara, 6–4, 6–4.
