= 2015 Keio Challenger – Doubles =

Doubles
- 2015 Keio Challenger

Final
- Champions: (Thailand) Sanchai Ratiwatana (Thailand) Sonchat Ratiwatana
- Runners-up: (Italy) Riccardo Ghedin (Chinese Taipei) Yi Chu-huan
- Score: 6–4, 6–4 .

Events
Singles	Doubles
- Keio Challenger

Sanchai Ratiwatana and Sonchat Ratiwatana won the title, defeating Riccardo Ghedin and Yi Chu-huan in the final 6–4, 6–4

== Seeds ==
1. (Thailand) Sanchai Ratiwatana / (Thailand) Sonchat Ratiwatana (champions)
2. (Italy) Riccardo Ghedin / (Chinese Taipei) Yi Chu-huan (final)
3. (China) Bai Yan / (China) Li Zhe (semifinals)
4. (Chinese Taipei) Chen Ti / (Croatia) Franko Škugor (semifinals)

== Draw ==
Key

- Q = Qualifier
- WC = Wild card
- LL = Lucky loser
- Alt = Alternate
- ITF = ITF entry
- PR = Protected ranking
- SR = Special ranking
- SE = Special exempt
- JE = Junior exempt
- JR = Junior Accelerator Programme entrant
- CO = College Accelerator Programme entrant
- NG = Next Gen Accelerator Program entrant
- w/o = Walkover
- r = Retired
- d = Defaulted

=== Draw ===
First round
1	(Thailand) Sa Ratiwatana (Thailand) So Ratiwatana	6	6
(Australia) O Jasika (Australia) Gavin van Peperzeel	4	1
WC	(Japan) T Matsui (Indonesia) C Rungkat	6	3	[3]
WC	(United States) JP Fruttero (Japan) K Uesugi	4	6	[10]
4	(Chinese Taipei) T Chen (Croatia) F Škugor	6	6
(Chinese Taipei) J Jung (South Africa) T Vorster	4	4
(Chinese Taipei) H-h Lee (Japan) Y Uchiyama	5	2
(Russia) K Kravchuk (Russia) A Kudryavtsev	7	6
(Chinese Taipei) J Wang (Chinese Taipei) T-h Yang	6	6
(Japan) B Sato (Japan) G Soeda	3	2
(Poland) A Kapaś (India) D Sharan	1	4
3	(China) Y Bai (China) Z Li	6	6
(United States) J Cerretani (Australia) J Thompson	3	2
(United Kingdom) B Klein (Australia) M Reid	6	6
WC	(Japan) Nasa Hatakeyama (Japan) Kaito Itsusaki	6^{4}	6^{2}
2	(Italy) R Ghedin (Chinese Taipei) C-h Yi	7^{7}	7^{7}

Quarterfinals
1	(Thailand) Sa Ratiwatana (Thailand) So Ratiwatana	6	6
WC	(United States) JP Fruttero (Japan) K Uesugi	2	4
4	(Chinese Taipei) T Chen (Croatia) F Škugor	7^{7}	6
(Russia) K Kravchuk (Russia) A Kudryavtsev	6^{2}	2
(Chinese Taipei) J Wang (Chinese Taipei) T-h Yang
3	(China) Y Bai (China) Z Li	w/o
(United Kingdom) B Klein (Australia) M Reid	4	3
2	(Italy) R Ghedin (Chinese Taipei) C-h Yi	6	6

Semifinals
1	(Thailand) Sa Ratiwatana (Thailand) So Ratiwatana	6	3	[13]
4	(Chinese Taipei) T Chen (Croatia) F Škugor	2	6	[11]
3	(China) Y Bai (China) Z Li	3	2
2	(Italy) R Ghedin (Chinese Taipei) C-h Yi	6	6

Final
1	(Thailand) Sa Ratiwatana (Thailand) So Ratiwatana	6	6
2	(Italy) R Ghedin (Chinese Taipei) C-h Yi	4	4
