= 2012 Keio Challenger – Doubles =

Doubles
- 2012 Keio Challenger

Final
- Champions: (India) Prakash Amritraj; (Austria) Philipp Oswald
- Runners-up: (Thailand) Sanchai Ratiwatana; (Thailand) Sonchat Ratiwatana
- Score: 6–3, 6–4

Events
Singles	Doubles
- Keio Challenger

Yang Tsung-hua and Yi Chu-huan won the last edition in 2009.
Prakash Amritraj and Philipp Oswald won the title, defeating Sanchai Ratiwatana and Sonchat Ratiwatana 6–3, 6–4 in the final.

== Seeds ==
1. (Thailand) Sanchai Ratiwatana / (Thailand) Sonchat Ratiwatana (final)
2. (Chinese Taipei) Lee Hsin-han / (Chinese Taipei) Peng Hsien-yin (quarterfinals)
3. (India) Purav Raja / (India) Divij Sharan (first round)
4. (Australia) Brydan Klein / (Australia) Dane Propoggia (semifinals)

== Draw ==
Key

- Q = Qualifier
- WC = Wild card
- LL = Lucky loser
- Alt = Alternate
- ITF = ITF entry
- PR = Protected ranking
- SR = Special ranking
- SE = Special exempt
- JE = Junior exempt
- JR = Junior Accelerator Programme entrant
- CO = College Accelerator Programme entrant
- NG = Next Gen Accelerator Program entrant
- w/o = Walkover
- r = Retired
- d = Defaulted

=== Draw ===
First round

Quarterfinals

Semifinals

Final

1
- (Thailand) Sa Ratiwatana
- (Thailand) So Ratiwatana
7
7^{7}

WC
(Japan) Koki Takada
(Japan) Takashi Yano
5
6^{3}

1
- (Thailand) Sa Ratiwatana
- (Thailand) So Ratiwatana
6
7^{7}

- (Australia) B Mitchell
- (Australia) M Reid
5
6
[6]

- (Netherlands) S Fransen
- (Australia) J Millman
2
6^{0}

- (Netherlands) Stephan Fransen
- (Australia) J Millman
7
4
[10]

1
- (Thailand) Sa Ratiwatana
- (Thailand) So Ratiwatana
6
7^{10}

4
- (Australia) B Klein
- (Australia) D Propoggia
6
7^{7}

4
- (Australia) B Klein
- (Australia) D Propoggia
3
6^{8}

WC
- (Japan) Daiki Kondo
- (Japan) K Uchida
0
6^{5}

4
- (Australia) B Klein
- (Australia) D Propoggia
6
6

- (Japan) H Moriya
- (Japan) Y Uchiyama
3
2

- (Bosnia and Herzegovina) M Bašić
- (Chinese Taipei) L-c Huang
1
2

- (Bosnia and Herzegovina) M Bašić
- (Chinese Taipei) L-c Huang
6
6

1
- (Thailand) Sa Ratiwatana
- (Thailand) So Ratiwatana
3
4

- (Chinese Taipei) T Chen
- (Russia) A Kudryavtsev
0
2

PR
- (India) P Amritraj
- (Austria) P Oswald
6
6

PR
- (India) P Amritraj
- (Austria) P Oswald
6
6

PR
- (India) P Amritraj
- (Austria) P Oswald
5
6
[10]

- (Japan) H Kondo
- (Chinese Taipei) C-h Yi
6
7^{7}

- (Japan) H Kondo
- (Chinese Taipei) C-h Yi
7
4
[6]

3
- (India) P Raja
- (India) D Sharan
3
6^{4}

PR
- (India) P Amritraj
- (Austria) P Oswald
6
6

- (Italy) Andrea Arnaboldi
- (Italy) M Viola
6
6

- (Italy) A Arnaboldi
- (Italy) M Viola
1
4

WC
(Japan) T Matsui
(Japan) Masato Shiga
4
4

- (Italy) A Arnaboldi
- (Italy) M Viola
6^{7}
6
[10]

- (Chinese Taipei) C-p Hsieh
- (Indonesia) C Rungkat
4
4

2
- (Chinese Taipei) H-h Lee
- (Chinese Taipei) H-y Peng
7^{9}
4
[7]

2
- (Chinese Taipei) H-h Lee
- (Chinese Taipei) H-y Peng
6
6
