= 2018 Keio Challenger – Men's singles =

Men's singles
- 2018 Keio Challenger

Final
- Champion: (Japan) Yasutaka Uchiyama
- Runner-up: (Japan) Tatsuma Ito
- Score: 2–6, 6–3, 6–4

Events
| Singles | men | women |
| Doubles | men | women |
- Keio Challenger

Yūichi Sugita was the defending champion but chose not to defend his title.

Yasutaka Uchiyama won the title after defeating Tatsuma Ito 2–6, 6–3, 6–4 in the final.

== Seeds ==
1. (Australia) Jordan Thompson (semifinals)
2. (Australia) John Millman (second round, withdrew)
3. (Chinese Taipei) Jason Jung (second round)
4. (Japan) Go Soeda (quarterfinals)
5. (France) Stéphane Robert (quarterfinals)
6. (South Korea) Kwon Soon-woo (first round)
7. (Japan) Tatsuma Ito (final)
8. (South Korea) Lee Duck-hee (second round)

== Draw ==
Key

- Q = Qualifier
- WC = Wild card
- LL = Lucky loser
- Alt = Alternate
- ITF = ITF entry
- PR = Protected ranking
- SR = Special ranking
- SE = Special exempt
- JE = Junior exempt
- JR = Junior Accelerator Programme entrant
- CO = College Accelerator Programme entrant
- NG = Next Gen Accelerator Program entrant
- w/o = Walkover
- r = Retired
- d = Defaulted

=== Finals ===
Semifinals
1 | (Australia) Jordan Thompson | 4 | 5
(Japan) Yasutaka Uchiyama | 6 | 7
(Turkey) Cem İlkel
7 | (Japan) Tatsuma Ito | w/o

Final
(Japan) Yasutaka Uchiyama | 2 | 6 | 6
7 | (Japan) Tatsuma Ito | 6 | 3 | 4

=== Top half ===
First round
1 | (Australia) J Thompson | 2 | 6 | 6
(India) P Gunneswaran | 6 | 4 | 3
Q | (Japan) Hiroyasu Ehara | 7^{10} | 6^{1} | 6
(Australia) A Whittington | 6^{8} | 7^{7} | 4
LL | (United States) D Nguyen | 6 | 6
WC | (Japan) Yo Watanuki | 2 | 4
Q | (Japan) Jumpei Yamasaki | 6 | 1 | 3
5 | (France) S Robert | 3 | 6 | 6
4 | (Japan) G Soeda | 6 | 6
WC | (Japan) Kaito Itsusaki | 0 | 2
(China) D Wu | 6 | 7^{7}
(China) Ze Zhang | 4 | 6^{5}
(Japan) Y Uchiyama | 6 | 3 | 6
(Poland) H Hurkacz | 4 | 6 | 4
WC | (Japan) S Hazawa | 6 | 4 | 7^{7}
6 | (South Korea) S-w Kwon | 3 | 6 | 6^{5}

Second round
1 | (Australia) J Thompson | 6 | 6
Q | (Japan) H Ehara | 4 | 2
LL | (United States) D Nguyen | 5 | 0
5 | (France) S Robert | 7 | 6
4 | (Japan) G Soeda | 7^{7} | 6
(China) D Wu | 6^{5} | 3
(Japan) Y Uchiyama | 6 | 7
WC | (Japan) S Hazawa | 3 | 5

Quarterfinals
1 | (Australia) J Thompson | 6 | 4 | 6
5 | (France) S Robert | 3 | 6 | 2
4 | (Japan) G Soeda | 6 | 6^{0} | 3
(Japan) Y Uchiyama | 4 | 7^{7} | 6

Semifinals
1 | (Australia) J Thompson | 4 | 5
(Japan) Y Uchiyama | 6 | 7

=== Bottom half ===
First round
8 | (South Korea) D-h Lee | 4 | 6 | 6
(Germany) T Pütz | 6 | 4 | 3
SE | (Australia) B Ellis | 3 | 4
(Turkey) C İlkel | 6 | 6
(Italy) M Donati | 7^{11} | 2 | 5
(Germany) T Kamke | 6^{9} | 6 | 7
Q | (South Korea) Y-s Chung | 2 | 7^{8} | 4
3 | (Chinese Taipei) J Jung | 6 | 6^{6} | 6
7 | (Japan) T Ito | 6 | 6
WC | (Japan) K Uesugi | 2 | 3
(Australia) J Kubler | 6 | 1 | 6
(Israel) E Leshem | 3 | 6 | 3
(Russia) K Kravchuk | 0 | 2
Q | (Japan) H Moriya | 6 | 6
(Australia) M Purcell | 3 | 6^{7}
2 | (Australia) J Millman | 6 | 7^{9}

Second round
8 | (South Korea) D-h Lee | 2 | 6 | 6^{5}
(Turkey) C İlkel | 6 | 2 | 7^{7}
(Germany) T Kamke | 6 | 6
3 | (Chinese Taipei) J Jung | 4 | 2
7 | (Japan) T Ito | 3 | 6 | 7^{7}
(Australia) J Kubler | 6 | 3 | 6^{3}
Q | (Japan) H Moriya | w/o
2 | (Australia) J Millman

Quarterfinals
(Turkey) C İlkel | 7^{7} | 6
(Germany) T Kamke | 6^{3} | 2
7 | (Japan) T Ito | 6 | 6
Q | (Japan) H Moriya | 3 | 3

Semifinals
(Turkey) C İlkel
7 | (Japan) T Ito | w/o
