= 2014 Keio Challenger =

Professional tennis tournament

- Date: 10 November – 16 November
- Edition: 10th
- Surface: Hard
- Location: Yokohama, Japan

Champions

Singles
- (Australia) John Millman

Doubles
- (United States) Bradley Klahn / (Australia) Matt Reid
← 2013 ·	Keio Challenger	· 2015 →

The 2014 Keio Challenger was a professional tennis tournament played on hard courts. It was the tenth edition of the tournament which is part of the 2014 ATP Challenger Tour. It took place in Yokohama, Japan between November 10 and November 16, 2014.

== Singles main-draw entrants ==
=== Seeds ===
Country	Player	Rank^{1}	Seed
JPN	Tatsuma Ito	103	1
JPN	Go Soeda	117	2
USA	Bradley Klahn	120	3
RUS	Alexander Kudryavtsev	121	4
JPN	Yūichi Sugita	124	5
JPN	Hiroki Moriya	146	6
JPN	Yoshihito Nishioka	164	7
KOR	Chung Hyeon	183	8

- ^{1} Rankings are as of November 3, 2014.

=== Other entrants ===
The following players received wildcards into the singles main draw:

- (Japan) Masato Shiga
- (Japan) Manato Tanimoto
- (Japan) Kaichi Uchida
- (Japan) Kaito Uesugi

The following players received entry from the qualifying draw:

- (South Korea) Kim Young-seok
- (South Korea) Nam Ji-sung
- (Japan) Shuichi Sekiguchi
- (Japan) Takao Suzuki

The following player received entry by a lucky loser spot:

- (South Korea) Kim Cheong-eui

The following player received entry by a protected ranking:

- (Australia) Greg Jones

== Champions ==
=== Singles ===
- (Australia) John Millman def. (United Kingdom) Kyle Edmund, 6–4, 6–4

=== Doubles ===
- (United States) Bradley Klahn / (Australia) Matt Reid def. (New Zealand) Marcus Daniell / (New Zealand) Artem Sitak, 4–6, 6–4, [10–7]
