= 2019 Keio Challenger – Men's doubles =

Men's doubles
- 2019 Keio Challenger

Final
- Champions: (Tunisia) Moez Echargui (Tunisia) Skander Mansouri
- Runners-up: (Australia) Max Purcell (Australia) Luke Saville
- Score: 7–6^{(8–6)}, 6–7^{(3–7)}, [10–7]

Events
Singles	men	women
Doubles	men	women
- Keio Challenger

Tobias Kamke and Tim Pütz were the defending champions but chose not to defend their title.

Moez Echargui and Skander Mansouri won the title after defeating Max Purcell and Luke Saville 7–6^{(8–6)}, 6–7^{(3–7)}, [10–7].

== Seeds ==
1. (Australia) Max Purcell / (Australia) Luke Saville (final)
2. (Thailand) Sanchai Ratiwatana / (Thailand) Sonchat Ratiwatana (semifinals)
3. (Philippines) Ruben Gonzales / (United States) Alex Lawson (first round)
4. (Russia) Ivan Gakhov / (Russia) Alexander Pavlioutchenkov (quarterfinals)

== Draw ==
Key

- Q = Qualifier
- WC = Wild card
- LL = Lucky loser
- Alt = Alternate
- ITF = ITF entry
- PR = Protected ranking
- SR = Special ranking
- SE = Special exempt
- JE = Junior exempt
- JR = Junior Accelerator Programme entrant
- CO = College Accelerator Programme entrant
- NG = Next Gen Accelerator Program entrant
- w/o = Walkover
- r = Retired
- d = Defaulted

First round
1	(Australia) M Purcell (Australia) L Saville	6	6
(Brazil) G Clezar (Portugal) G Elias	2	3
ITF	(Japan) Shintaro Imai (Portugal) B Saraiva	6	6
(Portugal) G Oliveira (Japan) K Uchida	2	2
3	(Philippines) R Gonzales (United States) A Lawson	5	4
WC	(Japan) T Matsui (Japan) K Uesugi	7	6
(South Korea) Y-s Chung (South Korea) S-w Kwon	6	4	[10]
(Chinese Taipei) J Wang (Chinese Taipei) T-h Yang	2	6	[7]
WC	(Japan) Masahiro Fukuda (Japan) M Imamura	2	4
ITF	(Tunisia) M Echargui (Tunisia) S Mansouri	6	6
(Australia) B Ellis (Austria) J Rodionov	6^{4}	6^{6}
4	(Russia) I Gakhov (Russia) A Pavlioutchenkov	7^{7}	7^{8}
(United States) JP Fruttero (Spain) D Pérez Sanz	w/o
(Argentina) P Cachin (Japan) H Moriya
WC	(Japan) S Hazawa (Japan) N Tajima	2	6	[5]
2	(Thailand) Sa Ratiwatana (Thailand) So Ratiwatana	6	3	[10]

Quarterfinals
1	(Australia) M Purcell (Australia) L Saville	6	6
ITF	(Japan) S Imai (Portugal) B Saraiva	3	2
WC	(Japan) T Matsui (Japan) K Uesugi	6	5	[4]
(South Korea) Y-s Chung (South Korea) S-w Kwon	3	7	[10]
ITF	(Tunisia) M Echargui (Tunisia) S Mansouri	7^{7}	6
4	(Russia) I Gakhov (Russia) A Pavlioutchenkov	6^{2}	4
(United States) JP Fruttero (Spain) D Pérez Sanz	5	6^{4}
2	(Thailand) Sa Ratiwatana (Thailand) So Ratiwatana	7	7^{7}

Semifinals
1	(Australia) M Purcell (Australia) L Saville	6	6
(South Korea) Y-s Chung (South Korea) S-w Kwon	4	0
ITF	(Tunisia) M Echargui (Tunisia) S Mansouri	4	6	[10]
2	(Thailand) Sa Ratiwatana (Thailand) So Ratiwatana	6	3	[6]

Final
1	(Australia) M Purcell (Australia) L Saville	6^{6}	7^{7}	[7]
ITF	(Tunisia) M Echargui (Tunisia) S Mansouri	7^{8}	6^{3}	[10]
