= 2013 Keio Challenger =

- Date: 11–17 November
- Edition: 9th
- Surface: Hard
- Location: Yokohama, Japan

Champions

Singles
- (Australia) Matthew Ebden

Doubles
- (United States) Bradley Klahn / (New Zealand) Michael Venus
← 2012 ·	Keio Challenger	· 2014 →

The 2013 Keio Challenger was a professional tennis tournament played on hard courts. It was the ninth edition of the tournament which was part of the 2013 ATP Challenger Tour. It took place in Yokohama, Japan between 11 and 17 November 2013. Mathew Ebden was the tournament champion over Go Soeda.

== Singles main-draw entrants ==
=== Seeds ===
Country	Player	Rank^{1}	Seed
AUS	Matthew Ebden	94	1
SLO	Blaž Kavčič	98	2
JPN	Go Soeda	115	3
USA	Bradley Klahn	118	4
AUS	James Duckworth	132	5
FRA	Pierre-Hugues Herbert	160	6
JPN	Yūichi Sugita	164	7
JPN	Tatsuma Ito	169	8

- ^{1} Rankings are as of November 4, 2013.

=== Other entrants ===
The following players received wildcards into the singles main draw:

- (Croatia) Borna Ćorić
- (Japan) Yoshihito Nishioka
- (Japan) Masato Shiga
- (Japan) Kaichi Uchida

The following players used protected ranking into the singles main draw:

- (United States) Daniel Kosakowski

The following players received entry from the qualifying draw:

- (United States) Chase Buchanan
- (South Korea) Chung Hyeon
- (Japan) Shuichi Sekiguchi
- (Japan) Yasutaka Uchiyama

== Champions ==
=== Singles ===
- (Australia) Matthew Ebden def. (Japan) Go Soeda 2–6, 7–6^{(7–3)}, 6–3

=== Doubles ===
- (United States) Bradley Klahn / (New Zealand) Michael Venus def. (Thailand) Sanchai Ratiwatana / (Thailand) Sonchat Ratiwatana 7–5, 6–1
