= 2018 Keio Challenger =

- Date: 26 February – 4 March (ATP); 5 – 11 March (ITF)
- Edition: 13th (ATP); 2nd (ITF)
- Category: ATP Challenger Tour; ITF Women's Circuit
- Surface: Hard
- Location: Yokohama, Japan

Champions

Men's singles
- (Japan) Yasutaka Uchiyama

Women's singles
- (Russia) Veronika Kudermetova

Men's doubles
- (Germany) Tobias Kamke / (Germany) Tim Pütz

Women's doubles
- (United Kingdom) Laura Robson / (Hungary) Fanny Stollár
← 2017 ·	Keio Challenger	· 2019 →

The 2018 Keio Challenger was a professional tennis tournament played on hard courts. It was the thirteenth (ATP) and second (ITF) editions of the tournament and part of the 2018 ATP Challenger Tour and the 2018 ITF Women's Circuit. It took place in Yokohama, Japan between 26 February and 4 March 2018 for the men's edition and between 5 and 11 March 2018 for the women's.

== Men's singles main-draw entrants ==
=== Seeds ===
Country	Player	Rank^{1}	Seed
AUS	Jordan Thompson	95	1
AUS	John Millman	103	2
TPE	Jason Jung	153	3
JPN	Go Soeda	156	4
FRA	Stéphane Robert	158	5
KOR	Kwon Soon-woo	180	6
JPN	Tatsuma Ito	181	7
KOR	Lee Duck-hee	190	8

- ^{1} Rankings are as of 19 February 2018.

=== Other entrants ===
The following players received wildcards into the singles main draw:

- (Japan) Shinji Hazawa
- (Japan) Kaito Itsusaki
- (Japan) Kaito Uesugi
- (Japan) Yosuke Watanuki

The following player received entry into the singles main draw as a special exempt:

- (Australia) Blake Ellis

The following players received entry from the qualifying draw:

- (South Korea) Chung Yun-seong
- (Japan) Hiroyasu Ehara
- (Japan) Hiroki Moriya
- (Japan) Jumpei Yamasaki

The following player received entry as a lucky loser:

- (United States) Daniel Nguyen

== Women's singles main-draw entrants ==
=== Seeds ===
Country	Player	Rank^{1}	Seed
JPN	Eri Hozumi	180	1
JPN	Junri Namigata	196	2
JPN	Miharu Imanishi	197	3
ITA	Georgia Brescia	202	4
GBR	Laura Robson	218	5
TUR	Ayla Aksu	226	6
RUS	Veronika Kudermetova	227	7
CHN	Lu Jiajing	232	8

- ^{1} Rankings are as of 26 February 2018.

=== Other entrants ===
The following players received wildcards into the singles main draw:

- (Japan) Ayumi Hirata
- (Japan) Marina Kurosu
- (Japan) Megumi Nishimoto
- (Japan) Satoko Sueno

The following players received entry from the qualifying draw:

- (United Kingdom) Harriet Dart
- (Japan) Misa Eguchi
- (Japan) Mai Hontama
- (Japan) Momoko Kobori
- (Chinese Taipei) Lee Ya-hsuan
- (China) Ma Yexin
- (Canada) Katherine Sebov
- (Japan) Moyuka Uchijima

== Champions ==
=== Men's singles ===
- (Japan) Yasutaka Uchiyama def. (Japan) Tatsuma Ito 2–6, 6–3, 6–4.

=== Women's singles ===
- (Russia) Veronika Kudermetova def. (United Kingdom) Harriet Dart, 6–2, 6–4

=== Men's doubles ===
- (Germany) Tobias Kamke / (Germany) Tim Pütz def. (Thailand) Sanchai Ratiwatana / (Thailand) Sonchat Ratiwatana 3–6, 7–5, [12–10].

=== Women's doubles ===
- (United Kingdom) Laura Robson / (Hungary) Fanny Stollár def. (Japan) Momoko Kobori / (Japan) Chihiro Muramatsu, 5–7, 6–2, [10–4]
