= 2012 Keio Challenger =

Tennis tournament

- Date: 12–18 November
- Edition: 8th
- Surface: Hard
- Location: Yokohama, Japan

Champions

Singles
- (Italy) Matteo Viola

Doubles
- (India) Prakash Amritraj / (Austria) Philipp Oswald
← 2009 ·	Keio Challenger	· 2013 →

The 2012 Keio Challenger was a professional tennis tournament played on hard courts. It was the eighth edition of the tournament which was part of the 2012 ATP Challenger Tour. It took place in Yokohama, Japan between 12 and 18 November 2012.

== Singles main-draw entrants ==
=== Seeds ===
Country	Player	Rank^{1}	Seed
JPN	Tatsuma Ito	65	1
USA	Rajeev Ram	112	2
JPN	Yūichi Sugita	121	3
ITA	Matteo Viola	149	4
JPN	Hiroki Moriya	186	5
TPE	Chen Ti	202	6
GBR	Jamie Baker	237	7
AUS	Brydan Klein	244	8

- ^{1} Rankings are as of November 5, 2012.

=== Other entrants ===
The following players received wildcards into the singles main draw:

- (Japan) Toshihide Matsui
- (Japan) Yoshihito Nishioka
- (Japan) Masato Shiga
- (Japan) Kaichi Uchida

The following players received entry from the qualifying draw:

- (Japan) Yuichi Ito
- (Japan) Yuuya Kibi
- (Japan) Shuichi Sekiguchi
- (New Zealand) Michael Venus

== Champions ==
=== Singles ===
- (Italy) Matteo Viola def. (Bosnia and Herzegovina) Mirza Bašić, 7–6^{(7–3)}, 6–3

=== Doubles ===
- (India) Prakash Amritraj / (Austria) Philipp Oswald def. (Thailand) Sanchai Ratiwatana / (Thailand) Sonchat Ratiwatana, 6–3, 6–4
