= 2015 Keio Challenger – Singles =

Singles
- 2015 Keio Challenger

Final
- Champion: (Japan) Taro Daniel
- Runner-up: (Japan) Go Soeda
- Score: 4–6, 6–3, 6–3

Events
Singles	Doubles
- Keio Challenger

The Keio Challenger is a professional tennis tournament played on hardcourts. It is currently part of the ATP Challenger Tour and the ITF Women's Circuit. Having been held in Yokohama, Japan since 1999. In 2015, Taro Daniel won the men's singles title, defeating Go Soeda in the final 4–6, 6–3, 6–3.

== Seeds ==
1. (Australia) John Millman (first round)
2. (Australia) Matthew Ebden (semifinals)
3. (Japan) Tatsuma Ito (semifinals)
4. (Japan) Go Soeda (final)
5. (Japan) Taro Daniel (champion)
6. (Japan) Yūichi Sugita (quarterfinals)
7. (Russia) Konstantin Kravchuk (second round)
8. (Japan) Yoshihito Nishioka (quarterfinals)

== Draw ==
Key

- Q = Qualifier
- WC = Wild card
- LL = Lucky loser
- Alt = Alternate
- ITF = ITF entry
- PR = Protected ranking
- SR = Special ranking
- SE = Special exempt
- JE = Junior exempt
- JR = Junior Accelerator Programme entrant
- CO = College Accelerator Programme entrant
- NG = Next Gen Accelerator Program entrant
- w/o = Walkover
- r = Retired
- d = Defaulted

=== Finals ===
Semifinals
5	(Japan) Taro Daniel	6	6
3	(Japan) Tatsuma Ito	4	1
4	(Japan) Go Soeda	7^{7}	6
2	(Australia) Matthew Ebden	6^{2}	4

Final
5	(Japan) Taro Daniel	4	6	6
4	(Japan) Go Soeda	6	3	3

=== Top half ===
First round
1	(Australia) J Millman	4	4
(Russia) A Kudryavtsev	6	6
(Chinese Taipei) J Wang	3	6	3
(Chinese Taipei) T-h Yang	6	3	6
(Australia) O Jasika	6	6
(China) Y Bai	1	4
Q	(Japan) Yuya Kibi	1	3
5	(Japan) T Daniel	6	6
3	(Japan) T Ito	6	7
Q	(Japan) K Takeuchi	2	5
(Chinese Taipei) T Chen	4	3
(United Kingdom) B Klein	6	6
(China) Z Li	5	6^{1}
(Australia) J Thompson	7	7^{7}
(Japan) H Moriya	6^{1}	4
7	(Russia) K Kravchuk	7^{7}	6

Second round
(Russia) A Kudryavtsev	7^{7}	6
(Chinese Taipei) T-h Yang	6^{4}	2
(Australia) O Jasika	3	6^{1}
5	(Japan) T Daniel	6	7^{7}
3	(Japan) T Ito	6	6
(United Kingdom) B Klein	4	4
(Australia) J Thompson	1	6	7^{7}
7	(Russia) K Kravchuk	6	3	6^{4}

Quarterfinals
(Russia) A Kudryavtsev	0	3
5	(Japan) T Daniel	6	6
3	(Japan) T Ito	6	7^{7}
(Australia) J Thompson	4	6^{4}

Semifinals
5	(Japan) T Daniel	6	6
3	(Japan) T Ito	4	1

=== Bottom half ===
First round
8	(Japan) Y Nishioka	6^{3}	7^{7}	4
Q	(United States) P Kobelt	7^{7}	6^{1}	2^{r}
WC	(Japan) K Uesugi	6^{5}	1
(Chinese Taipei) J Jung	7^{7}	6
(South Korea) D-h Lee	6	6
(Japan) Y Uchiyama	2	4
(Australia) Gavin van Peperzeel	2	5
4	(Japan) G Soeda	6	7
6	(Japan) Y Sugita	6	6
WC	(Japan) Sora Fukuda	1	0
WC	(Japan) Makoto Ochi	2	6	5
WC	(Japan) Masato Shiga	6	4	7
(Croatia) F Škugor	7^{8}	6
(South Africa) T Vorster	6^{6}	4
Q	(Japan) Yu Watanuki	5	1
2	(Australia) M Ebden	7	6

Second round
8	(Japan) Y Nishioka	6	7
(Chinese Taipei) J Jung	2	5
(South Korea) D-h Lee	5	4
4	(Japan) G Soeda	7	6
6	(Japan) Y Sugita	6	6
WC	(Japan) M Shiga	1	2
(Croatia) F Škugor	1	0^{r}
2	(Australia) M Ebden	6	0

Quarterfinals
8	(Japan) Y Nishioka	6^{6}	0
4	(Japan) G Soeda	7^{8}	6
6	(Japan) Y Sugita	4	6	0
2	(Australia) M Ebden	6	1	6

Semifinals
4	(Japan) G Soeda	7^{7}	6
2	(Australia) M Ebden	6^{2}	4
