= 2015 Keio Challenger =

- Date: 16 November – 22 November
- Edition: 11th
- Surface: Hard
- Location: Yokohama, Japan

Champions

Singles
- (Japan) Taro Daniel

Doubles
- (Thailand) Sanchai Ratiwatana / (Thailand) Sonchat Ratiwatana
← 2014 ·	Keio Challenger	· 2017 →

The 2015 Keio Challenger is a professional tennis tournament played on hard courts. It is the eleventh edition of the tournament which is part of the 2015 ATP Challenger Tour. It takes place in Yokohama, Japan between November 16 and November 22, 2015.

== Singles main-draw entrants ==
=== Seeds ===
Country	Player	Rank^{1}	Seed
AUS	John Millman	91	1
AUS	Matthew Ebden	107	2
JPN	Tatsuma Ito	113	3
JPN	Go Soeda	115	4
JPN	Taro Daniel	119	5
JPN	Yūichi Sugita	123	6
RUS	Konstantin Kravchuk	145	7
JPN	Yoshihito Nishioka	146	8

- ^{1} Rankings are as of November 9, 2015.

=== Other entrants ===
The following players received wildcards into the singles main draw:

- (Japan) Sora Fukuda
- (Japan) Makoto Ochi
- (Japan) Masato Shiga
- (Japan) Kaito Uesugi

The following players received entry from the qualifying draw:

- (Japan) Yusuke Watanuki
- (Japan) Kento Takeuchi
- (Japan) Yuya Kibi
- (United States) Peter Kobelt

== Champions ==
=== Singles ===
- (Japan) Taro Daniel def. (Japan) Go Soeda 4–6, 6–3, 6–3

=== Doubles ===
- (Thailand) Sanchai Ratiwatana / (Thailand) Sonchat Ratiwatana def. (Italy) Riccardo Ghedin / (Chinese Taipei) Yi Chu-huan 6–4, 6–4
