= Taro Daniel =

Japanese tennis player (born 1993)

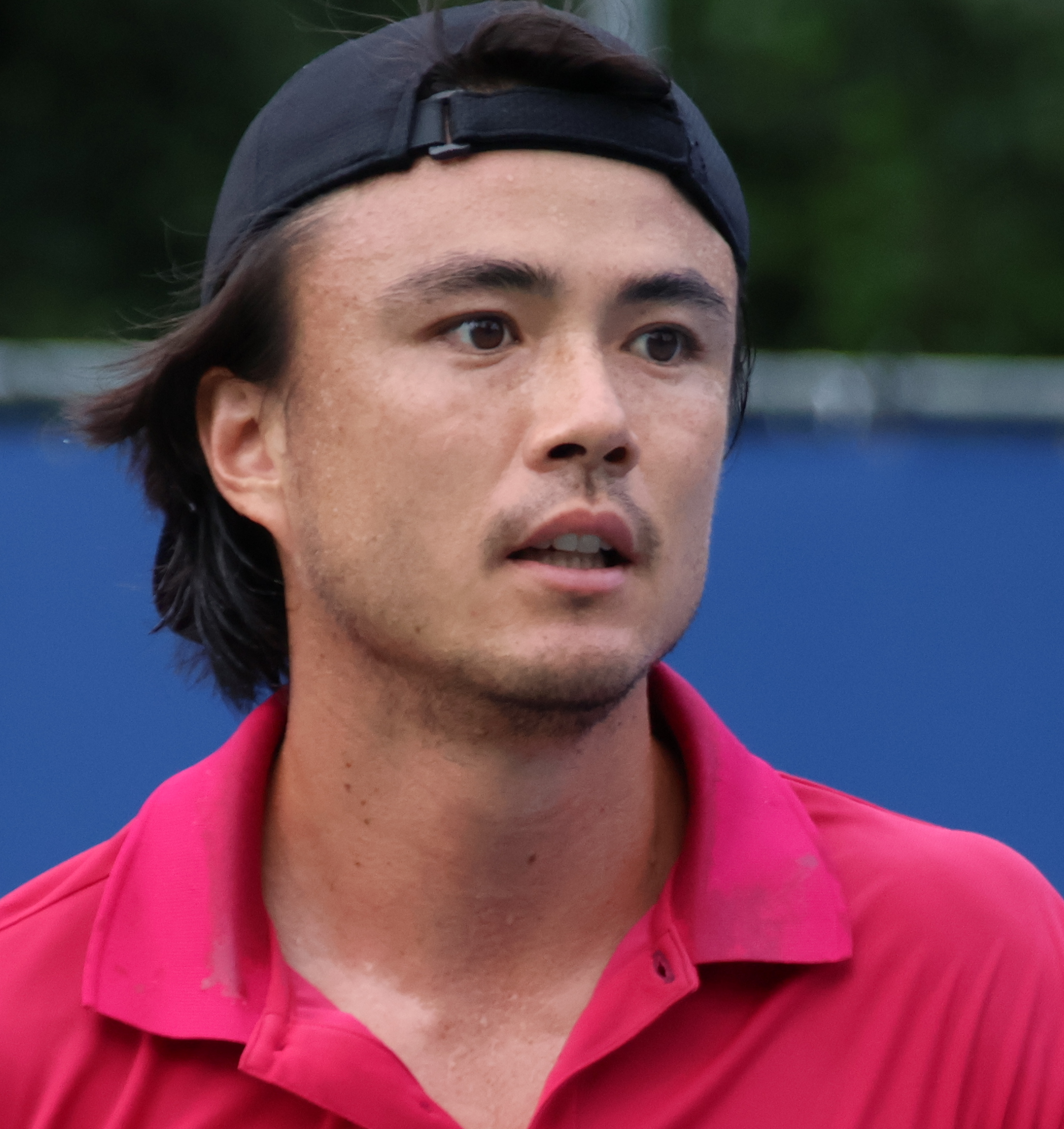
- Daniel at the 2025 Mubadala Citi DC Open
- Country (sports): Japan
- Residence: Bradenton, Florida, U.S.
- Born: 27 January 1993 (age 33) New York City, U.S.
- Height: 1.91 m (6 ft 3 in)
- Turned pro: 2010
- Plays: Right-handed (two-handed backhand)
- Coach: Jackie Reardon Jose Altur
- Prize money: US $5,079,358

Singles
- Career record: 91–156
- Career titles: 1
- Highest ranking: No. 58 (15 January 2024)
- Current ranking: No. 160 (31 August 2026)

Grand Slam singles results
- Australian Open: 3R (2022)
- French Open: 2R (2016, 2017, 2023)
- Wimbledon: 1R (2016, 2017, 2018, 2022, 2023, 2024)
- US Open: 2R (2017)

Other tournaments
- Olympic Games: 3R (2016)

Doubles
- Career record: 3–24
- Career titles: 0
- Highest ranking: No. 351 (27 May 2019)

Grand Slam doubles results
- Australian Open: 1R (2019)
- Wimbledon: 1R (2018)

Other doubles tournaments
- Olympic Games: 1R (2024)
- Last updated on: 1 September 2026.

Taro Daniel (ダニエル 太郎, Danieru Tarō; born 27 January 1993) is an American-Japanese professional tennis player. He achieved a career-high singles ranking of world No. 58 on 15 January 2024. He has won one ATP Tour singles title at the 2018 Istanbul Open, as well as nine ATP Challenger Tour singles titles. He is currently the No. 5 Japanese singles player.

== Personal life ==
Taro's mother, Yasue, was Japanese and his father, Paul Daniel, is American. He grew up in various places throughout the world. He spent most of his elementary school days in Saitama, Japan. He went to Nagoya International School. Taro and his family moved to Spain when he was 14 years old. He speaks Japanese, English and Spanish. He has one younger sister, Kana.

== Tennis career ==
=== Early years ===
Taro started playing tennis when he was 7 years old. He practiced at the Shinrin Longwood Tennis Club in Nagoya City during his years in Japan. He got third place for under 12 in the All Japan Junior Tennis Tournament.

=== 2011–13: First Challenger final, top 250 ===
Daniel had won a couple of ITF Futures events in Spain and Portugal. On the ATP Challenger Tour, he made the semifinals at the Yokohama in November 2012, and reached his first Challenger final at the Yeongwol in November 2013, where he lost to fourth seed Bradley Klahn in the final. In 2011–2013, Daniel had raised his ATP ranking from world No. 978 to 241.

=== 2014: Grand Slam debut ===
Daniel reached the third qualifying round of the 2014 Australian Open, losing to Thomaz Bellucci. Qualifying for his first ATP tournament, he made the quarterfinals of the Chile Open, after gaining revenge over Bellucci and defeating eighth seed Federico Delbonis. His run was ended by third seed Nicolas Almagro.

At the 2014 Davis Cup World Group quarterfinal against the Czech Republic, Daniel was nominated for the first time for the Japan Davis Cup team. He played the singles rubber, but lost to Lukáš Rosol in a five-setter and Jiří Veselý.

Daniel qualified for the 2014 US Open to make his Grand Slam main-draw debut, losing to fifth seed Milos Raonic in the first round. The next week, he reached the final at the Seville Challenger, where he was defeated by top seed Pablo Carreño Busta.

=== 2015: Top 100 ===
After competing in the ATP events of Montpellier and Casablanca, Daniel defeated Filippo Volandri to claim his first ATP Challenger Tour title in Vercelli. He qualified for the 2015 French Open, losing to 32nd seed Fernando Verdasco in the first round. In July, Daniel won the Fürth Challenger, defeating top seeds Blaž Rola and Albert Montañés.

At 2015 Davis Cup World Group play-offs against Colombia, Daniel won the first Davis Cup match of his career, beating Alejandro Falla in the last tie. His victory completed a come-from-behind victory against Colombia to remain in the World Group for 2016. In October, he qualified for the Valencia Open, and reached the second round, before losing to sixth seed Guillermo García-López. He completed the 2015 season with his third Challenger title in Yokohama, winning over his countryman Go Soeda in the final.

He entered the top 100 in the ATP rankings for the first time at world No. 93 on 23 November 2015.

=== 2016: Masters debut and win, Major first win, Olympics debut ===
Daniel received direct entry to the main draw of the 2016 Australian Open, losing in the first round to Lukáš Rosol in five sets. In February, he reached the second round of the Open Sud de France before losing to eighth seed Marcos Baghdatis in straight sets. At 2016 Davis Cup World Group first round in Birmingham, Japan faced defending champion Great Britain. He was defeated by world No. 2 Andy Murray in straight sets; Japan lost 1–3.

Daniel qualified for the Monte-Carlo Masters to make his ATP World Tour Masters 1000 main-draw debut. He beat Adrian Mannarino in straight sets to reach the second round, where he lost to 12th seed Dominic Thiem in three sets. He then competed at Bucharest and Estoril, reaching the second rounds in both tournaments. In the 2016 French Open, he advanced to the second round of Major tournaments for the first time in his career when his opponent Martin Kližan had to retire from injury in the fifth set. He lost to third seed and defending champion Stan Wawrinka in straight sets despite having two set points in the first set and being up a break in the third. He next competed in the 2016 Wimbledon Championships, losing in the first round to Juan Mónaco in four sets.

Daniel competed in the Olympics, where he defeated the No. 14 seed Jack Sock in straight sets in the first round. Daniel then beat Kyle Edmund of Great Britain before losing to Juan Martín del Potro, despite having won the first set.

=== 2017–18: First Masters third round and ATP title, Top 65 debut ===
Daniel reached the second round of the 2017 US Open where he lost to Rafael Nadal in four sets.

In March at the 2018 Indian Wells Masters, Daniel qualified for the main draw and defeated Cameron Norrie and world No. 13 Novak Djokovic in three sets to reach the third round.

In May, he made his first ATP final at the 2018 Istanbul Open, where he played Tunisian Malek Jaziri, also in his first final. Daniel beat Jaziri 7–6 6–4 to win his first ATP title. Daniel climbed to his career high ranking of No. 64 on 27 August 2018.

He finished the 2018 season ranked No. 77.

=== 2019–21: Out of top 100, Olympics ===
Daniel, as a lucky loser, reached the semifinals in 2021 Serbia Open in Belgrade, where he beat João Sousa, 7th seed John Millman and Federico Delbonis, but lost to second seed and eventual champion Matteo Berrettini.

=== 2022: Grand Slam third round, back to top 100 ===
After winning through 2022 Australian Open qualifying, Daniel made it to the third round of a Grand Slam for the first time in his career, beating Tomás Barrios and former finalist Andy Murray in the process. He lost to 10th seed Jannik Sinner in the third round.

At the 2022 BNP Paribas Open in Indian Wells in March, having beaten him at Melbourne, Daniel lost to Andy Murray, giving the Scot the 700th match win of his career on the ATP Tour.

Daniel reached back-to-back quarterfinals in Belgrade, beating Dušan Lajović and Holger Rune. He lost to second seed and eventual champion Andrey Rublev in straight sets.

He finished the 2022 season ranked No. 92.

=== 2023: Best season: First Top 10 win, Two consecutive Masters third rounds ===
Ranked No. 125 at the Mexican Open, Daniel reached the quarterfinals as a qualifier defeating second seed Casper Ruud for his first top 10 win of his career.

At the 2023 BNP Paribas Open he defeated Roberto Carballes Baena and 20th seed Matteo Berrettini to reach the third round of a Masters as a qualifier for the second time at this tournament and in his career. As a result he returned to the top 100. He received a wildcard into the 2023 Miami Open where he defeated Arthur Rinderknech who retired in the first round. Next he defeated 13th seed Alexander Zverev to reach back-to-back Masters third rounds in two weeks.

He finished the 2023 season ranked No. 75, his highest year-end career ranking.

=== 2024: Second ATP final, top 60, Japanese No. 1 ===
Taro reached his second ATP final at the 2024 ASB Classic in Auckland, New Zealand defeating top seed Ben Shelton becoming the first Japanese finalist at the tournament. As a result he reached the top 60 at world No. 58 in the singles rankings on 15 January 2024. He became the No. 1 Japanese male player. He lost to qualifier Alejandro Tabilo in straight sets.

== ATP career finals ==
=== Singles: 2 (1 title, 1 runner-up) ===
Legend Grand Slam tournaments (0–0) ATP World Tour Finals (0–0) ATP World Tour Masters 1000 (0–0) ATP World Tour 500 Series (0–0) ATP World Tour 250 Series (1–1)	Finals by surface Hard (0–1) Clay (1–0) Grass (0–0)

Result	W–L	Date	Tournament	Tier	Surface	Opponent	
Win	1–0	May 2018	Istanbul Open, Turkey	250 Series	Clay	(Tunisia) Malek Jaziri	7–6^{(7–4)}, 6–4
Loss	1–1	Jan 2024	Auckland, New Zealand	250 Series	Hard	(Chile) Alejandro Tabilo	2–6, 5–7

== Challenger and ITF Finals ==
=== Singles: 31 (14–17) ===
Legend (singles) ATP Challenger Tour (10–12) ITF Futures Tour (4–5)	Titles by surface Hard (6–8) Clay (8–9) Grass (0–0) Carpet (0–0)

Result	W–L	Date	Tournament	Tier	Surface	Opponent	Score
Loss	0-1	May 2011	Spain F14, Balaguer	Futures	Clay	(Portugal) João Sousa	3–6, 1–6
Loss	0-2	Sep 2011	Spain F32, Oviedo	Futures	Clay	(Russia) Andrey Kuznetsov	5–7, 1–6
Loss	0-3	May 2012	Spain F12, Valldoreix	Futures	Clay	(Spain) Jordi Samper Montaña	6–4, 6–7^{(2–7)}, 5–7
Win	1-3	Jun 2012	Spain F15, Santa Margarida de Montbui	Futures	Clay	(Russia) Alexander Lobkov	7–5, 7–5
Win	2-3	Jul 2012	Spain F20, Gandia	Futures	Clay	(Spain) Marc Giner	6–3, 6–4
Loss	2-4	Aug 2012	Spain F22, Xativa	Futures	Clay	(Spain) Ivan Navarro	3–6, 3–6
Loss	2-5	Feb 2013	Spain F2, Mallorca	Futures	Clay	(Spain) Pablo Carreño Busta	3–6, 7–5, 1–6
Win	3-5	May 2013	Spain F14, Valldoreix	Futures	Clay	(Canada) Steven Diez	6–3, 6–2
Win	4-5	Oct 2013	Portugal F9, Porto	Futures	Clay	(Spain) Ricardo Ojeda Lara	6–0, 6–3
Loss	4-6	Nov 2013	Yeongwol, South Korea	Challenger	Hard	(United States) Bradley Klahn	6–7^{(5–7)}, 2–6
Loss	4-7	Sep 2014	Seville, Spain	Challenger	Clay	(Spain) Pablo Carreño Busta	4–6, 1–6
Win	5-7	Apr 2015	Vercelli, Italy	Challenger	Clay	(Italy) Filippo Volandri	6–3, 1–6, 6–4
Win	6-7	Jun 2015	Fürth, Germany	Challenger	Clay	(Spain) Albert Montañés	6–3, 6–0
Loss	6-8	Nov 2015	Kobe, Japan	Challenger	Hard (i)	(Australia) John Millman	1–6, 3–6
Win	7-8	Nov 2015	Yokohama, Japan	Challenger	Hard	(Japan) Go Soeda	4–6, 6–3, 6–3
Win	8-8	Aug 2016	Cordenons, Italy	Challenger	Clay	(Spain) Daniel Gimeno Traver	6–3, 6–4
Loss	8-9	Sep 2016	Seville, Spain	Challenger	Clay	(Norway) Casper Ruud	3–6, 4–6
Loss	8-10	Jan 2017	Maui, USA	Challenger	Hard	(South Korea) Chung Hyeon	6–7^{(3–7)}, 1–6
Win	9-10	Mar 2017	Tigre, Argentina	Challenger	Hard	(Argentina) Leonardo Mayer	5–7, 6–3, 6–4
Loss	9-11	Jun 2017	Lisbon, Portugal	Challenger	Clay	(Germany) Oscar Otte	6–4, 1–6, 3–6
Loss	9-12	Oct 2017	Ningbo, China	Challenger	Hard	(Russia) Mikhail Youzhny	1–6, 1–6
Loss	9-13	Nov 2017	Canberra, Australia	Challenger	Hard	(Australia) Matthew Ebden	6–7^{(4–7)}, 4–6
Loss	9-14	Jun 2018	Poznań, Poland	Challenger	Clay	(Poland) Hubert Hurkacz	1–6, 1–6
Win	10-14	Jan 2020	Burnie, Australia	Challenger	Hard	(Germany) Yannick Hanfmann	6–2, 6–2
Win	11-14	Nov 2020	Hamburg, Germany	Challenger	Hard (i)	(Austria) Sebastian Ofner	6–1, 6–2
Win	12-14	Oct 2023	Sydney, Australia	Challenger	Hard	(Australia) Marc Polmans	6–2, 6–4
Loss	12-15	Nov 2023	Matsuyama, Japan	Challenger	Hard	(Italy) Luca Nardi	6–3, 4–6, 2–6
Win	13-15	Oct 2024	Taipei, Taiwan	Challenger	Hard	(Australia) Adam Walton	6–4, 7–5
Loss	13–16	Nov 2024	Seoul, Korea	Challenger	Hard	(Georgia (country)) Nikoloz Basilashvili	5–7, 4–6
Loss	13–17	Mar 2026	Cuernavaca, Mexico	Challenger	Hard	(United States) Michael Mmoh	6–4, 4–6, 3–6
Win	14–17	Jun 2026	Bratislava, Slovakia	Challenger	Clay	(Kazakhstan) Alexander Shevchenko	3–6, 6–0, 7–6^{(7–2)}

=== Doubles: 1 (1 runner-up) ===
Legend
ATP Challenger Tour (0–1)

Outcome	W–L	Date	Tournament	Surface	Partner	Opponents	Score
Loss	0–1	Sep 2013	Kenitra, Morocco	Clay	(Russia) Alexander Rumyantsev	(Spain) Gerard Granollers (Spain) Jordi Samper-Montana	4–6, 4–6

== Performance timelines ==
Key
W	F	SF	QF	#R	RR	Q#	P#	DNQ	A	Z#	PO	G	S	B	NMS	NTI	P	NH

(W) winner; (F) finalist; (SF) semifinalist; (QF) quarterfinalist; (#R) rounds 4, 3, 2, 1; (RR) round-robin stage; (Q#) qualification round; (P#) preliminary round; (DNQ) did not qualify; (A) absent; (Z#) Davis/Fed Cup Zonal Group (with number indication) or (PO) play-off; (G) gold, (S) silver or (B) bronze Olympic/Paralympic medal; (NMS) not a Masters tournament; (NTI) not a Tier I tournament; (P) postponed; (NH) not held; (SR) strike rate (events won / competed); (W–L) win–loss record.
To avoid confusion and double counting, these charts are updated at the conclusion of a tournament or when the player's participation has ended.

=== Singles ===
Tournament	2014	2015	2016	2017	2018	2019	2020	2021	2022	2023	2024	2025	W–L
Grand Slam tournaments
Australian Open	Q3	Q1	1R	Q2	1R	2R	Q1	1R	3R	2R	1R	1R	4–8
French Open	Q1	1R	2R	2R	Q2	A	Q2	1R	1R	2R	1R	Q1	3–7
Wimbledon	Q1	Q1	1R	1R	1R	A	NH	A	1R	1R	1R	Q2	0–6
US Open	1R	Q3	A	2R	1R	Q1	1R	1R	1R	1R	1R	Q2	1–8
Win–loss	0–1	0–1	1–3	2–3	0–3	1–1	0–1	0–3	2–4	2–4	0–4	0–1	8–29
ATP Masters 1000 tournaments
Indian Wells Masters	Q1	Q1	A	A	3R	1R	NH	2R	1R	3R	2R	Q1	6–6
Miami Open	Q1	Q2	A	A	Q2	1R	NH	A	2R	3R	1R	Q1	3–4
Monte Carlo Masters	A	A	2R	Q1	A	1R	NH	A	Q2	Q2	A	A	1–2
Madrid Open	A	A	A	A	A	Q1	NH	A	A	Q1	R1	Q1	0–1
Italian Open	A	A	A	Q1	A	Q1	Q2	A	A	Q1	Q1	Q1	0–0
Canadian Open	A	A	A	A	A	A	NH	A	Q2	2R	1R	Q1	1–2
Cincinnati Open	A	A	A	A	Q1	A	Q1	A	Q1	A	Q1	Q1	0–0
Shanghai Masters	A	A	A	Q1	Q2	A	NH			1R	2R	Q1	1–2
Paris Masters	A	A	A	A	Q1	A	A	A	A	A	A		0–0
Career statistics
	2014	2015	2016	2017	2018	2019	2020	2021	2022	2023	2024	2025	Career
Tournaments	5	5	15	9	18	18	4	11	19	16	3		123
Titles–Finals	0 / 0	0 / 0	0 / 0	0 / 0	1 / 1	0 / 0	0 / 0	0 / 0	0 / 0	0 / 0	0 / 1		1 / 2
Overall win–loss	2–7	2–6	10–16	4–10	17–18	13–18	1–4	5–11	13–19	12–16	4–3		83–128
Year-end ranking	177	96	127	99	77	110	117	125	92	75	83		39.34%

== Wins over top 10 players ==
- He has a 1–9 record against players who were, at the time the match was played, ranked in the top 10.

Season	2023	Total
Wins	1	1

#	Player	Rank	Event	Surface	Rd	Score	TDR
2023
1.	(Norway) Casper Ruud	4	Mexican Open	Hard	2R	7–5, 2–6, 7–6^{(7–5)}	125
