= Luke Saville =

Australian professional tennis player (born 1994)

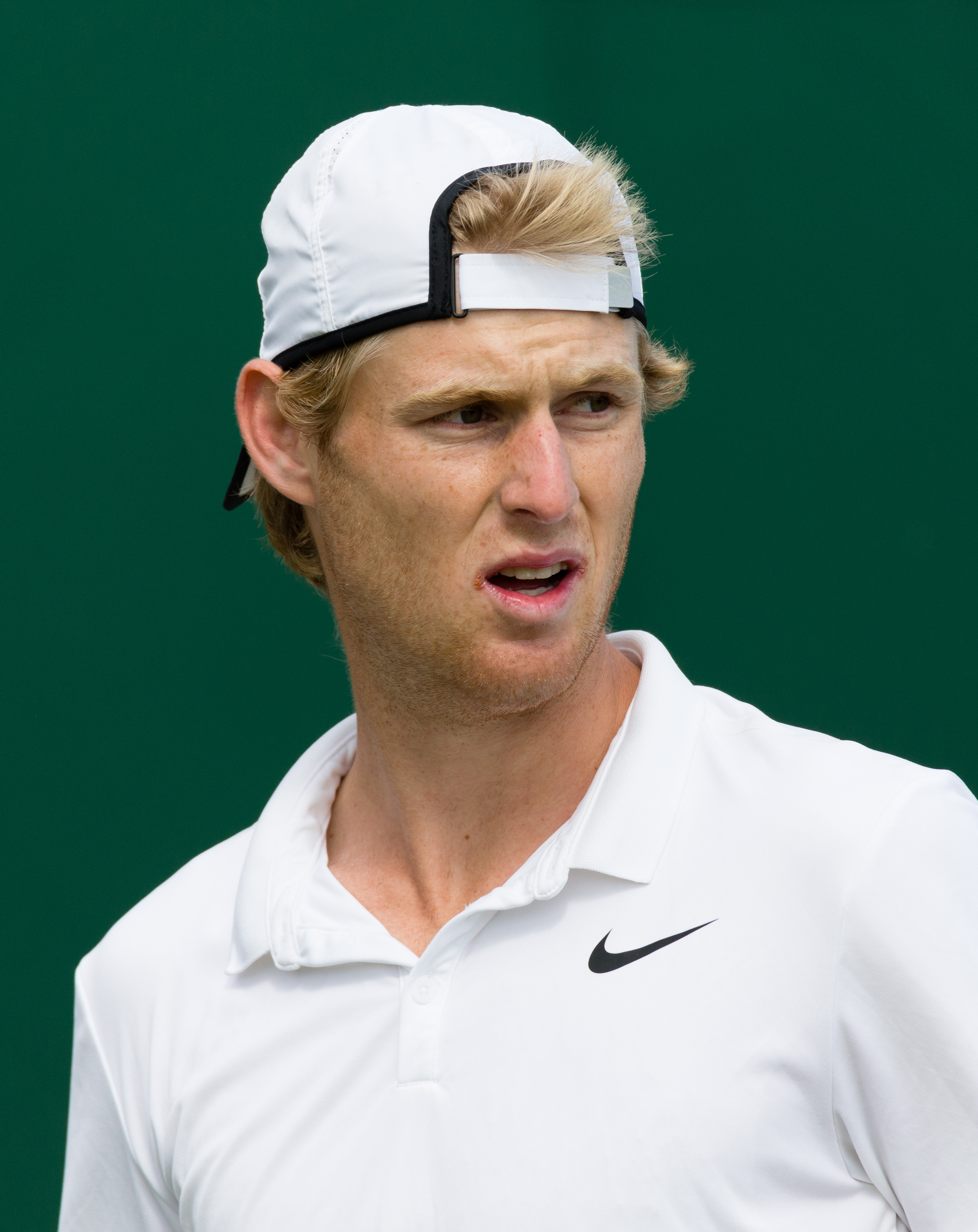
- Saville at the 2015 Wimbledon qualifying tournament
- Country (sports): Australia
- Residence: Cobdogla, South Australia
- Born: 1 February 1994 (age 32) Berri, South Australia
- Height: 1.88 m (6 ft 2 in)
- Turned pro: 2012
- Retired: 19 January 2025
- Plays: Right-handed (two-handed backhand)
- Coach: Rohan Williams
- Prize money: $1,431,995

Singles
- Career record: 2–8
- Career titles: 0
- Highest ranking: No. 152 (23 February 2015)

Grand Slam singles results
- Australian Open: 1R (2013, 2015)
- French Open: Q2 (2015)
- Wimbledon: 2R (2014)
- US Open: Q1 (2015, 2016)

Other tournaments
- Olympic Games: 1R (2021)

Doubles
- Career record: 57–79
- Career titles: 0
- Highest ranking: No. 23 (8 November 2021)

Grand Slam doubles results
- Australian Open: F (2020)
- French Open: 3R (2021)
- Wimbledon: 3R (2021)
- US Open: 2R (2022)

Other doubles tournaments
- Olympic Games: 1R (2021)

Grand Slam mixed doubles results
- Australian Open: 2R (2015)
- French Open: 1R (2021)
- US Open: 1R (2021)

Luke Saville (born 1 February 1994) is an Australian former professional tennis player. He has had success as a doubles player where he reached his highest ranking of World No. 23 on 8 November 2021. Saville reached the final at the 2020 Australian Open, partnering with fellow Australian Max Purcell.

As a junior, Saville enjoyed a successful career in which he won two junior grand slam singles titles at the 2011 Wimbledon Championships and 2012 Australian Open. Saville is also a former junior World No. 1 and an Australian Institute of Sport scholarship holder. In January 2013, he competed in his first ATP main draw event at the 2013 Australian Open, but has struggled in transitioning from Juniors onto the professional circuit, reaching his highest singles ranking of World No. 152.

== Personal life ==
Saville was born in Berri, South Australia. He is a keen supporter of the Carlton in the Australian Football League. He has a brother Troy and a sister Katie, who also play club tennis. His relationship with now-wife Russian-born Australian tennis player, Daria Gavrilova influenced her decision to become an Australian citizen. In September 2025, the couple announced Daria was pregnant with their first child. He is a cousin of Shannon Nettle, a former tennis player.

== Junior career ==
Saville began to compete in big junior events at the start of 2009, when he was given wildcards into G1 tournaments in Australia. He managed to reach the round of 16 in both tournaments, being taken out by James Duckworth and Nikala Scholtz. He beat Greivis Valadziemer in the 2009 Australian Open, but then lost to Dino Marcan in three sets. Later in 2009, Saville was a part of the victorious Australian Junior Davis Cup Team with teammates Jason Kubler and Joey Swaysland.

Saville had a great start to the 2011 with a run against Adam Pavlásek, Dominic Thiem, Nikola Milojević, Lucas Pouille, and Roberto Carballés to reach the final of the 2011 Australian Open, but losing to Jiří Veselý in straight sets in the final.

Saville then won the junior 2011 Wimbledon title, beating Lucas Vrnac, Evgyny Lovskiy, Thiago Moura Monteiro, Joris De Looreand, and Kaichi Uchida on his way to the final. He then defeated home player Liam Broady in three sets.

In 2012, Saville once again made it to the final of the junior Australian Open, where he beat opponent Filip Peliwo in three sets. He became the first Australian to win the Australian Open juniors title since Bernard Tomic in 2008. Later that year, Saville reached the final of 2012 Wimbledon Championships, where he again faced Filip Peliwo. He lost in straight sets.

As a junior, Saville posted a singles win–loss record of 96–39 (and 65–38 in doubles), reaching the no. 1 combined world ranking in January 2012.

=== Junior singles titles (5) ===
Legend (singles)
Grand Slam (2)
Grade A (0)
Grade B (1)
Grade 1–5 (2)

No.	Date	Tournament	Surface	Opponent in the final	Score
1.	30 October 2010	Nonthaburi	Hard	(Russia) Evgeny Karlovskiy	W 6–3, 6–2
2.	3 July 2011	Wimbledon	Grass	(United Kingdom) Liam Broady	W 2–6, 6–4, 6–2
3.	30 October 2011	Chuncheon	Hard	(Australia) Andrew Harris	W 7–6^{(7–2)}, 6–4
4.	6 November 2011	Jeju-Do	Hard	(Australia) Andrew Harris	W 6–3, 6–4
5.	28 January 2012	Australian Open	Hard	(Canada) Filip Peliwo	W 6–3, 5–7, 6–4
6.	8 July 2012	Wimbledon	Grass	(Canada) Filip Peliwo	L 5–7, 4–6

== Professional career ==
=== 2008–2011 ===
Saville entered his first professional event in October 2008 as a 14-year-old. The event was held in his home state of South Australia. Saville was awarded a bye in the first round of qualifying but lost in the second round to Ben Mitchell 5–7, 0–6.

Saville competed in his first main draw of a futures tournament in February 2009 when he was awarded a wildcard into a futures tournament in Mildura, he fell in the first round to Miles Armstrong 5–7, 0–6. The following week he was awarded a second wildcard into the main draw of a futures tournament held in Berri, South Australia, the birthplace of Saville. He would lose in the first round to Matt Reid 4–6, 4–6. In preparation for the junior Davis Cup finals Saville was awarded his third wildcard into a futures event held in Darwin. As a fifteen-year-old he won his first round against Steven Goh 7–6^{(3)}, 6–3 and in doing so earned his first ever ATP ranking points as well as becoming the youngest player on the ATP rankings. Saville would go on to lose to John Millman in the second round 2–6, 0–6.

Saville was awarded a wildcard into the 2010 Australian Open qualifying draw where he fell in the first round to Frenchman Alexandre Sidorenko 1–6, 1–6. Following the Australian Open Saville was awarded a wildcard into his first ever challenger event in Burnie, he went down gallantly in three sets to Dayne Kelly 6–4, 3–6, 4–6. In March Saville traveled to Spain to train at the AIS headquarters and in doing so entered a Spanish futures tournament, he would lose in the first round of qualifying. On return to Australia Saville continued to play clay court tournaments leading up to the Roland Garros juniors by receiving wildcards into future tournaments in Ipswich and Bundaberg respectively. He would reach the second round of both tournaments. Saville entered three more Australian future tournaments later that year but failed to make it past the first round.

Saville once again began his year with a wildcard into the Australian Open qualifying but failed to make it past the first round after losing to Nicolas Mahut in the first round. Following his runner up appearance at the Australian Open juniors he was once again granted a wildcard into the challenger held in Burnie but fell in the first round to Paolo Lorenzi. Throughout the rest of the year Saville competed in futures tournaments across Australia, Thailand, Italy, Netherlands, Great Britain and USA but failed to make it past the first round of the main draw in all tournaments. He would hit some form at the end of 2011 where he made his first ever professional quarterfinal in the last future tournament of the year held in Australia. Saville would finish the year ranked 1,176 in the world.

=== 2012: Turned Pro ===
Saville was awarded qualifying wildcards into the events held in Brisbane, Sydney, and the Australian Open. In Brisbane, Saville reached the second round of qualifying, after defeating Alex Bolt, 6–4, 1–6, 6–3, but later fell to Tatsuma Ito in the second round, 2–6, 2–6. In Sydney qualifying, Saville was knocked out in the first round by Andre Begemann, 4–6, 4–6. Saville lost in the first round of Australian Open qualifying, going down to Ivo Minář, 6–7^{(3)}, 1–6.

=== 2013: Grand Slam debut ===
Saville began his year by losing in the opening rounds of qualifying at both the 2013 Brisbane International and Sydney International to John Millman and Tatsuma Ito, his first top 100 opponent. Saville was awarded a wildcard into the 2013 Australian Open for his Grand Slam debut. In his first ATP main draw, he lost in round one to Japanese Go Soeda in four sets. After a number of early round losses in futures and challenger tournaments in Australia, Japan and the United States. After a number of early losses, Saville made the final of the USA futures F10 event in Little Rock. He lost in straight sets to Austin Krajicek.

From May to August, Saville competed in tournaments throughout Asia and North America, with a record of five wins to seven losses. His top result being in the Korea futures F5 event where he reached the quarterfinals. In September, Saville returned to form competing in Australian Futures tournaments. He reached the semifinal at the F6 event in Toowoomba, going down to Andrew Whittington in three sets. After losing in the second round of the Australia F7 in Cairns, he again won through to a semifinal at the Australia F8 tournament in Alice Springs. He lost to Jordan Thompson in a third set tiebreak. After a first round loss in the Australia F9 tournament in Sydney to Blake Mott, Saville won his first title of the year at the Australia F10 event in Sydney. He defeated Yasutaka Uchiyama in a three set final. He was forced to withdraw from his match with Jordan Thompson with a hamstring injury. Saville then returned to the challenger circuit with first round and second round losses in the 2013 Melbourne Challenger and the Traralgon ATP Challenger. In November, Saville made the final of the Thailand F4, but lost to Yasutaka Uchiyama in three sets. He lost to Uchiyama again in round 2 the following week in the Thailand F5. Saville finished his year with a semifinal loss at the Australian Open Wildcard Playoff to Ben Mitchell in straight sets. Saville finished 2013 ranked World No. 398.

=== 2014: Top 200 debut ===
Saville was given a wildcard into qualifying at the 2014 Australian Open where he lost in the first round to Paul Capdeville in three sets. Saville then lost in the first round of the 2014 Burnie International and the second round of the 2014 Charles Sturt Adelaide International.

Saville next competed in the Australia 2014 Futures F1 event in Happy Valley where he reached the final, and went down in straights sets to Jarmere Jenkins. The next week in the Australia F2 in Port Pirie, Saville went on to win the title against Jordan Thompson after he was forced to withdraw while Saville led by a set and a break. Saville then claimed another title in the Australia F3 event in Mildura with a three set win over Dane Propoggia. After losing in the second round of the Australia F4 event, Saville went on to win his third Futures title of the year in Glen Iris. Saville defeated Alex Bolt in the final in a match where he was forced to save multiple match points. Saville's run of form in the futures tournaments lifted his ranking from World No. 397 to No. 250.

In May, Saville, made the quarterfinals of the Gimcheon Challenger, but lost to eventual finalist Tatsuma Ito. This was his best result at a Challenger tour event. Saville scored his first top 100 win against top seed Thomaz Bellucci in the first round of qualifying at the 2014 Wimbledon Championships. After defeating Rhyne Williams in three sets, Saville won a long five set final round against Yann Marti which meant he had qualified for the main draw. This would be just his second main draw ATP match of his career. In the first round, he prevailed against Dominic Thiem in four sets. This was his first win in a major championship and as a result, he broke into the top 200 for the first time. He lost to Grigor Dimitrov in the second round. Saville played his final grass court tournament for the year at the 2014 Hall of Fame Tennis Championships in Newport. He defeated Sarvar Ikramov and Hiroki Moriya to qualify for his third ATP main draw. He defeated Peter Polansky in straight sets before losing to Nicolas Mahut in the second round.

In July, Saville sustained a lower back issue in the quarterfinals of the Granby Challenger. This injury sidelined him from the US Open and competition for almost three months. Saville returned from injury in October and made the final of the Australia futures F8 event, but lost to Jarmere Jenkins in straight sets. Saville reached the quarterfinals of the 2014 Traralgon ATP Challenger 1, going down to John-Patrick Smith, after taking the first set. He then reached the semifinals of the 2014 Traralgon ATP Challenger 2, before losing to eventual champion John Millman. This result gave him a career high ranking of World No. 158. He lost in the first round of the Toyota Challenger in a third set tiebreak to Mao-Xin Gong. Saville finished the year at the Australian Open Wildcard Playoff where he reached the semifinal. He was forced to withdraw from his match with Jordan Thompson with a hamstring injury. Saville finished the year with a ranking of World No. 164.

=== 2015: Career-high in singles, Maiden Challenger final ===
Saville was given a wild card into the 2015 Australian Open, where he lost in round 1 to Tim Smyczek in straight sets. In February, Saville reached the quarter final of the 2015 Delhi Open. As a result, he reached a career-high in singles of World No. 152 on 23 February 2015.

In May, Saville made the second round of French Open qualifying. In June, Saville made his first final on the ATP Challenger Tour, losing to compatriot Sam Groth in the Manchester Challenger. Following that, Saville qualified for Wimbledon for the second year in a row, saving a match point and fighting back from two sets down to defeat higher-ranked Italian Luca Vanni in the final round of qualifying. Saville lost in the first round to 21st seed Richard Gasquet in straight sets. In August, Saville won the USA F24 title against Kevin King, but lost in round 1 of qualifying for the US Open to Karen Khachanov.

In October, Saville returned to Australia where he made the final of the Brisbane F9, losing to Gavin van Peperzeel in three sets 6–7, 6–2, 6–7. He made the final of the Canberra International but lost to Benjamin Mitchell 7–5, 0–6, 1–6. Saville finished the year with a ranking of world number 174.

=== 2016: Loss of form in singles ===
Saville lost in round one of qualifying for the 2016 Apia International Sydney and 2016 Australian Open. In February, Saville made the semi-final of the 2016 Launceston Tennis International before heading to Asia where he played in a number of Challenger tournaments, with limited success. In May, Saville lost in round 1 of qualifying for the 2016 French Open. In June, Saville made the quarter final of the Surbiton Challenger before qualifying for the 2016 Wimbledon Championships for the third year in a row Saville finished the year with a ranking of world number 266.

=== 2017: Resurgence in doubles and top 150 debut ===
After a disappointing 2016 campaign, Saville admitted that the pressure of expectations had gotten to him in the past, but was "finding his mojo" again after reuniting with former coach Des Tyson. Despite his hopes, 2017 was a disaster year for Saville, who posted just nine main draw singles wins on the Challenger and Futures circuit and failed to make it past the second round at any tournament. Saville also failed to feature in a grand slam main draw since 2012. As a result, Saville's ranking plummeted to World No. 521 in singles to close out the year, his worst year-end ranking since 2011.

Despite having an unsuccessful year in singles, Saville managed to make seven Challenger doubles finals in 2017, winning once. He finished the season ranked World No. 130 in doubles.

=== 2018: Three doubles Challengers titles, New partnership with Max Purcell ===
Saville commenced the 2018 year on the Australian Challenger circuit, with limited success. In March, Saville reached the final of the Australia F1, losing to Marc Polmans. It was Saville's first singles final in over 2 years. Saville travelled to Asia and qualified for 2 Challenger main draws from 5 attempts. Saville experiences similar limited success across Europe and North American challenger circuit, his best result being a quarterfinal appearance at the Columbus Challenger in September. In October, he reached the first Challenger final with new partner fellow Australian Max Purcell in Traralgon, Australia. In November, the duo went on to win their first Challenger in Bangalore, India.

=== 2020: First Grand Slam doubles final and second ATP final ===
At the 2020 Australian Open, he paired with Max Purcell as a wildcard in doubles, where they reached the final losing to 11th seeded pair American Rajeev Ram and Brit Joe Salisbury. The pair also reached their second final of the season of the 2020 Astana Open where they lost to Belgians Sander Gillé/Joran Vliegen.

=== 2021: Two Major doubles third rounds, Olympics in singles & doubles, top 25 ===
At the Olympics, Saville was entered as a last-minute alternate for Hungarian Márton Fucsovics who had withdrawn due to right shoulder injury. He also participated in the doubles competition with John Millman.

After reaching the third rounds at the 2021 French Open, 2021 Wimbledon Championships, and the quarterfinals of the Canada Masters 1000 in the 2021 National Bank Open edition, he reached the top 30 in doubles at World No. 28 on 16 August 2021.

=== 2025: Retirement ===
Saville announced his retirement from professional tennis in January 2025, with a final appearance at the 2025 Australian Open where he partnered Li Tu as a wildcard pair. He played his last match after reaching the third round, losing to Sem Verbeek and André Göransson.

== Significant finals ==
=== Grand Slam tournament finals ===
==== Doubles: 1 (1 runner-up) ====
Outcome	Year	Championship	Surface	Partner	Opponents	Score
Loss	2020	Australian Open	Hard	(Australia) Max Purcell	(United States) Rajeev Ram (United Kingdom) Joe Salisbury	4–6, 2–6

== ATP career finals ==
=== Doubles: 5 (5 runner-ups) ===
Legend Grand Slam tournaments (0–1) ATP World Tour Finals (0–0) ATP World Tour Masters 1000 (0–0) ATP World Tour 500 Series (0–0) ATP World Tour 250 Series (0–4)	Finals by surface Hard (0–4) Clay (0–0) Grass (0–1)	Finals by setting Outdoor (0–4) Indoor (0–1)

Result	W–L	Date	Tournament	Tier	Surface	Partner	Opponents	Score
Loss	0–1	Feb 2020	Australian Open, Australia	Grand Slam	Hard	(Australia) Max Purcell	(United States) Rajeev Ram (United Kingdom) Joe Salisbury	4–6, 2–6
Loss	0–2	Nov 2020	Astana Open, Kazakhstan	250 Series	Hard (i)	(Australia) Max Purcell	(Belgium) Sander Gillé (Belgium) Joran Vliegen	5–7, 3–6
Loss	0–3	Jan 2022	Maharashtra Open, India	250 Series	Hard	(Australia) John-Patrick Smith	(India) Rohan Bopanna (India) Ramkumar Ramanathan	7–6^{(12–10)}, 3–6, [6–10]
Loss	0–4	Jun 2022	Eastbourne International, United Kingdom	250 Series	Grass	(Netherlands) Matwé Middelkoop	(Croatia) Nikola Mektić (Croatia) Mate Pavić	4–6, 2–6
Loss	0–5	Sep 2022	San Diego Open, United States	250 Series	Hard	(Australia) Jason Kubler	(United States) Nathaniel Lammons (United States) Jackson Withrow	6–7^{(5–7)}, 2–6

== Challenger and Futures finals ==
=== Singles: 23 (11–12) ===
Legend (singles) ATP Challenger Tour (0–2) ITF Futures Tour (11–10)	Titles by surface Hard (8–7) Clay (1–1) Grass (2–4) Carpet (0–0)

Result	W–L	Date	Tournament	Tier	Surface	Opponent	Score
Win	1–0	May 2012	Thailand F1, Bangkok	Futures	Hard	(France) Antoine Escoffier	2–6, 6–4, 6–0
Win	2–0	Sep 2012	Australia F5, Cairns	Futures	Hard	(Australia) Michael Look	6–1, 7–6^{(7–3)}
Loss	2–1	Oct 2012	Australia F11, Traralgon	Futures	Hard	(Australia) Benjamin Mitchell	3–6, 6–2, 1–6
Loss	2–2	Apr 2013	USA F11, Little Rock	Futures	Hard	(United States) Austin Krajicek	4–6, 2–6
Win	3–2	Oct 2013	Australia F10, Sydney	Futures	Hard	(Japan) Yasutaka Uchiyama	4–6, 6–4, 6–4
Loss	3–3	Nov 2013	Thailand F4, Bangkok	Futures	Hard	(Japan) Yasutaka Uchiyama	1–6, 6–3, 1–6
Loss	3–4	Feb 2014	Australia F1, Happy Valley	Futures	Hard	(United States) Jarmere Jenkins	2–6, 3–6
Win	4–4	Mar 2014	Australia F2, Port Pirie	Futures	Hard	(Australia) Jordan Thompson	6–2, 3–1 ret.
Win	5–4	Mar 2014	Australia F3, Mildura	Futures	Grass	(Australia) Dane Propoggia	7–5, 6–7^{(5–7)}, 6–0
Win	6–4	Apr 2014	Australia F5, Glen Iris	Futures	Clay	(Australia) Alex Bolt	4–6, 7–6^{(7–4)}, 6–4
Loss	6–5	Oct 2014	Australia F8, Toowoomba	Futures	Hard	(United States) Jarmere Jenkins	3–6, 5–7
Loss	6–6	Jun 2015	Manchester, Great Britain	Challenger	Grass	(Australia) Sam Groth	5–7, 1–6
Win	7–6	Aug 2015	USA F24, Decatur	Futures	Hard	(United States) Kevin King	6–4, 6–4
Loss	7–7	Oct 2015	Australia F9, Brisbane	Futures	Hard	(Australia) Gavin van Peperzeel	6–7^{(6–8)}, 6–2, 6–7^{(7–9)}
Loss	7–8	Nov 2015	Canberra, Australia	Challenger	Clay	(Australia) Benjamin Mitchell	7–5, 0–6, 1–6
Loss	7–9	Mar 2018	Australia F1, Renmark	Futures	Grass	(Australia) Marc Polmans	1–6, 4–6
Loss	7–10	Oct 2019	M25 Brisbane, Australia	World Tennis Tour	Hard	(Australia) Dayne Kelly	2–6, 4–6
Win	8–10	Jan 2020	M15 Te Anau, New Zealand	World Tennis Tour	Hard	(Italy) Andrea Vavassori	6–3, 6–1
Loss	8–11	Mar 2023	M25 Swan Hill, Australia	World Tennis Tour	Grass	(Australia) Thomas Fancutt	4–6, 7–6^{(7–3)}, 5–7
Win	9–11	Jul 2023	M25 Roehampton, United Kingdom	World Tennis Tour	Grass	(United Kingdom) Daniel Cox	6–4, 1–6, 6–1
Win	10–11	Jul 2023	M15 Caloundra, Australia	World Tennis Tour	Hard	(Japan) Ryuki Matsuda	6–4, 6–3
Win	11–11	Aug 2023	M15 Caloundra, Australia	World Tennis Tour	Hard	(New Zealand) Isaac Becroft	7–5, 6–0
Loss	11–12	Mar 2024	M25 Mildura, Australia	World Tennis Tour	Grass	(Australia) Alex Bolt	2–6, 2–6

=== Doubles: 50 (33–17) ===
Legend (doubles) ATP Challenger Tour (22–15) ITF Futures Tour (11–2)	Finals by surface Hard (30–15) Clay (1–0) Grass (1–2) Carpet (1–0)

Result	W–L	Date	Tournament	Tier	Surface	Partner	Opponents	Score
Win	1–0	Nov 2011	Australia F12, Traralgon	Futures	Hard	(Australia) Andrew Whittington	(Australia) John Peers (Australia) Dane Propoggia	4–6, 6–4, [10–5]
Win	2–0	Nov 2011	Australia F13, Bendigo	Futures	Hard	(Australia) Andrew Whittington	(Australia) Matthew Barton (Australia) Michael Look	6–7^{(7–9)}, 6–4, [12–10]
Loss	2–1	Feb 2012	Australia F1, Toowoomba	Futures	Hard	(Australia) Andrew Whittington	(Australia) Brydan Klein (Australia) Dane Propoggia	6–7^{(4–7)}, 2–6
Win	3–1	Sep 2012	Australia F7, Happy Valley	Futures	Hard	(Australia) Andrew Whittington	(Japan) Yuichi Ito (Japan) Yusuke Watanuki	6–3, 6–2
Win	4–1	Oct 2012	Australia F10, Margaret River	Futures	Hard	(Australia) Andrew Whittington	(Australia) Matthew Barton (Australia) Michael Look	7–6^{(8–6)}, 7–6^{(7–4)}
Loss	4–2	Feb 2015	Kolkata, India	Challenger	Hard	(Australia) James Duckworth	(India) Somdev Devvarman (India) Jeevan Nedunchezhiyan	w/o
Loss	4–3	Jul 2015	Granby, Canada	Challenger	Hard	(France) Enzo Couacaud	(Canada) Philip Bester (Canada) Peter Polansky	7–6^{(7–5)}, 6–7^{(2–7)}, [7–10]
Win	5–3	Feb 2016	Launceston, Australia	Challenger	Hard	(Australia) Jordan Thompson	(Australia) Dayne Kelly (Australia) Matt Reid	6–1, 4–6, [13–11]
Win	6–3	Mar 2016	Shenzhen, China	Challenger	Hard	(Australia) Jordan Thompson	(India) Saketh Myneni (India) Jeevan Nedunchezhiyan	3–6, 6–4, [12–10]
Win	7–3	Jul 2016	Lexington, USA	Challenger	Hard	(Australia) Jordan Thompson	(South Africa) Nicolaas Scholtz (South Africa) Tucker Vorster	6–2, 7–5
Win	8–3	Sep 2016	Australia F5, Alice Springs	Futures	Hard	(Australia) Marc Polmans	(Australia) Thomas Fancutt (Australia) Calum Puttergill	6–1, 6–2
Win	9–3	Oct 2016	Australia F8, Cairns	Futures	Hard	(Australia) Marc Polmans	(United States) Nathan Pasha (Australia) Darren Polkinghorne	4–6, 6–3, [10–7]
Win	10–3	Nov 2016	Canberra, Australia	Challenger	Hard	(Australia) Jordan Thompson	(Australia) Matt Reid (Australia) John-Patrick Smith	6–2, 6–3
Loss	10–4	Feb 2017	Burnie, Australia	Challenger	Hard	(Australia) Steven de Waard	(United Kingdom) Brydan Klein (Australia) Dane Propoggia	3–6, 4–6
Win	11–4	Feb 2017	Launceston, Australia	Challenger	Hard	(Australia) Bradley Mousley	(Australia) Alex Bolt (Australia) Andrew Whittington	6–2, 6–1
Loss	11–5	Mar 2017	Yokohama, Japan	Challenger	Hard	(Belgium) Joris De Loore	(Croatia) Marin Draganja (Croatia) Tomislav Draganja	6–4, 3–6, [4–10]
Loss	11–6	Mar 2017	Guadalajara, Mexico	Challenger	Hard	(Australia) John-Patrick Smith	(Mexico) Santiago González (New Zealand) Artem Sitak	3–6, 6–1, [5–10]
Loss	11–7	Jul 2017	Binghamton, USA	Challenger	Hard	(Australia) Jarryd Chaplin	(United States) Denis Kudla (United States) Daniel Nguyen	3–6, 6–7^{(5–7)}
Loss	11–8	Sep 2017	Gwangju, South Korea	Challenger	Hard	(Australia) Jarryd Chaplin	(Chinese Taipei) Chen Ti (Japan) Ben McLachlan	6–2, 6–7^{(1–7)}, [1–10]
Loss	11–9	Nov 2017	Canberra, Australia	Challenger	Hard	(Australia) Andrew Whittington	(Australia) Alex Bolt (Australia) Bradley Mousley	3–6, 2–6
Win	12–9	Feb 2018	Kyoto, Japan	Challenger	Carpet (i)	(Australia) Jordan Thompson	(Japan) Go Soeda (Japan) Yasutaka Uchiyama	6–3, 5–7, [10–6]
Win	13–9	Sep 2018	Tiburon, USA	Challenger	Hard	(Mexico) Hans Hach	(Spain) Gerard Granollers Pujol (Spain) Pedro Martínez	6–3, 6–2
Win	14–9	Oct 2018	Australia F8, Toowoomba	Futures	Hard	(Australia) Blake Ellis	(United Kingdom) Brydan Klein (Australia) Scott Puodziunas	6–4, 6–7^{(2–7)}, [10–2]
Loss	14–10	Oct 2018	Traralgon, Australia	Challenger	Hard	(Australia) Max Purcell	(Australia) Jeremy Beale (Australia) Marc Polmans	2–6, 4–6
Win	15–10	Nov 2018	Bangalore, India	Challenger	Hard	(Australia) Max Purcell	(India) Purav Raja (Croatia) Antonio Šančić	7–6^{(7–3)}, 6–3
Win	16–10	Jan 2019	Playford, Australia	Challenger	Hard	(Australia) Max Purcell	(Uruguay) Ariel Behar (Spain) Enrique López Pérez	6–4, 7–5
Win	17–10	Feb 2019	Launceston, Australia	Challenger	Hard	(Australia) Max Purcell	(Japan) Hiroki Moriya (Egypt) Mohamed Safwat	7–5, 6–4
Loss	17–11	Feb 2019	Chennai, India	Challenger	Hard	(Australia) Matt Reid	(Italy) Gianluca Mager (Italy) Andrea Pellegrino	4–6, 6–7^{(7–9)}
Loss	17–12	Mar 2019	Yokohama, Japan	Challenger	Hard	(Australia) Max Purcell	(Tunisia) Moez Echargui (Tunisia) Skander Mansouri	6–7^{(6–8)}, 7–6^{(7–3)}, [7–10]
Loss	17–13	Mar 2019	Zhuhai, China, P.R.	Challenger	Hard	(Australia) Max Purcell	(China) Gong Maoxin (China) Zhang Ze	4–6, 4–6
Win	18–13	Mar 2019	Zhangjiagang, China, P.R.	Challenger	Hard	(Australia) Max Purcell	(Mexico) Hans Hach (India) Sriram Balaji	6–2, 7–6^{(7–5)}
Win	19–13	Mar 2019	Anning, China, P.R.	Challenger	Clay	(Australia) Max Purcell	(Chile) Hans Podlipnik Castillo (Netherlands) David Pel	4–6, 7–5, [10–5]
Win	20–13	May 2019	Seoul, South Korea	Challenger	Hard	(Australia) Max Purcell	(Belgium) Ruben Bemelmans (Ukraine) Sergiy Stakhovsky	6–4, 7–6^{(9–7)}
Win	21–13	Jul 2019	Binghamton, USA	Challenger	Hard	(Australia) Max Purcell	(United States) Alex Lawson (United States) JC Aragone	6–4, 4–6, [10–5]
Win	22–13	Oct 2019	M25 Brisbane, Australia	World Tennis Tour	Hard	(Australia) Jake Delaney	(Philippines) Francis Casey Alcantara (Australia) Harry Bourchier	6–1, 3–6, [10–6]
Win	23-13	Oct 2019	Traralgon, Australia	Challenger	Hard	(Australia) Max Purcell	(United Kingdom) Brydan Klein (Australia) Scott Puodziunas	6–7^{(2–7)}, 6–3, [10–4]
Win	24-13	Jan 2020	Bendigo, Australia	Challenger	Hard	(Australia) Max Purcell	(Israel) Jonathan Erlich (Belarus) Andrei Vasilevski	7–6^{(7–3)}, 7–6^{(7–3)}
Loss	24–14	Feb 2020	Cleveland, USA	Challenger	Hard	(Australia) John-Patrick Smith	(Philippines) Treat Huey (United States) Nathaniel Lammons	5–7, 2–6
Win	25-14	Feb 2020	Cuernavaca, Mexico	Challenger	Hard	(Australia) John-Patrick Smith	(Spain) Carlos Gómez-Herrera (Japan) Shintaro Mochizuki	6–3, 6–7^{(4–7)}, [10–5]
Loss	25–15	Feb 2023	Burnie, Australia	Challenger	Hard	(Australia) Tristan Schoolkate	(Australia) Marc Polmans (Australia) Max Purcell	6–7^{(4–7)}, 4–6
Win	26–15	Feb 2023	M25 Burnie, Australia	World Tennis Tour	Hard	(Australia) Tristan Schoolkate	(Australia) Calum Puttergill (Australia) Adam Walton	7–5, 6–4
Win	27–15	Feb 2023	M25 Swan Hill, Australia	World Tennis Tour	Grass	(Australia) Tristan Schoolkate	(Australia) Blake Bayldon (Australia) Edward Winter	6–3, 7–6^{(7–3)}
Win	28–15	Feb 2023	M25 Swan Hill, Australia	World Tennis Tour	Hard	(Australia) Tristan Schoolkate	(Australia) Blake Ellis (Australia) Matthew Christopher Romios	6–3, 6–4
Win	29-15	Sep 2023	Shanghai, China	Challenger	Hard	(Australia) Alex Bolt	(China) Rigele Te (China) Yunchaokete Bu	4–6, 6–3, [11–9]
Win	30–15	Feb 2024	Burnie, Australia	Challenger	Hard	(Australia) Alex Bolt	(Australia) Tristan Schoolkate (Australia) Adam Walton	5–7, 6–3, [12–10]
Loss	30–16	Mar 2024	M25 Swan Hill, Australia	World Tennis Tour	Hard	(Australia) Jesse Delaney	(Australia) Hayden Jones (New Zealand) Ajeet Rai	4–6, 4–6
Loss	30–17	June 2024	Nottingham, United Kingdom	Challenger	Grass	(France) Harold Mayot	(Australia) John Peers (United Kingdom) Marcus Willis	1–6, 7–6^{(7–1)}, [7–10]
Win	31–17	July 2024	Chicago, United States	Challenger	Hard	(Australia) Li Tu	(United States) Mac Kiger (Canada) Benjamin Sigouin	6–4, 3–6, [10–3]
Win	32–17	Sep 2024	Charleston, United States	Challenger	Hard	(Australia) Tristan Schoolkate	(Australia) Calum Puttergill (Australia) Dane Sweeny	6–7^{(3–7)}, 6–1, [10–3]
Win	33–17	Sep 2024	Tiburon, United States	Challenger	Hard	(Australia) Tristan Schoolkate	(United States) Patrick Kypson (United States) Eliot Spizzirri	6–4, 6–2

== Junior Grand Slam finals ==
=== Singles: 4 (2 titles, 2 runners-up) ===
Result	Year	Tournament	Surface	Opponent	Score
Loss	2011	Australian Open	Hard	(Czech Republic) Jiří Veselý	0–6, 3–6
Win	2011	Wimbledon	Grass	(United Kingdom) Liam Broady	2–6, 6–4, 6–2
Win	2012	Australian Open	Hard	(Canada) Filip Peliwo	6–3, 5–7, 6–4
Loss	2012	Wimbledon	Grass	(Canada) Filip Peliwo	5–7, 4–6

== Performance timelines ==
Key
W	F	SF	QF	#R	RR	Q#	DNQ	A	NH

(W) winner; (F) finalist; (SF) semifinalist; (QF) quarterfinalist; (#R) rounds 4, 3, 2, 1; (RR) round-robin stage; (Q#) qualification round; (DNQ) did not qualify; (A) absent; (NH) not held; (SR) strike rate (events won / competed); (W–L) win–loss record.
To avoid confusion and double counting, these charts are updated at the conclusion of a tournament or when the player's participation has ended.

=== Singles ===
Tournament	2010	2011	2012	2013	2014	2015	2016	2017	2018	2019	2020	2021	SR	W–L
Australian Open	Q1	Q1	Q1	1R	Q1	1R	Q1	Q1	A	Q1	Q2	A	0 / 2	0–2
French Open	A	A	A	A	A	Q2	Q1	A	A	A	A	A	0 / 0	0–0
Wimbledon	A	A	A	A	2R	1R	1R	A	A	A	NH	A	0 / 3	1–3
US Open	A	A	A	A	A	Q1	Q1	A	A	A	A	A	0 / 0	0–0
Win–loss	0–0	0–0	0–0	0–1	1–1	0–2	0–1	0–0	0–0	0–0	0–0	0–0	0 / 5	1–5

=== Doubles ===
Tournament	2012	2013	2014	2015	2016	2017	2018	2019	2020	2021	2022	2023	2024	2025	SR	W–L	Win %
Grand Slam tournaments
Australian Open	1R	A	1R	1R	1R	1R	2R	1R	F	2R	1R	3R	1R	3R	0 / 13	11–13	46%
French Open	A	A	A	A	A	A	A	A	1R	3R	2R	A	A		0 / 3	3–3	50%
Wimbledon	A	A	A	A	A	A	A	1R	NH	3R	1R	A	A		0 / 3	2–3	40%
US Open	A	A	A	A	A	A	A	A	1R	1R	2R	A	A		0 / 3	1–3	25%
Win–loss	0–1	0–0	0–1	0–1	0–1	0–1	1–1	0–2	5–3	5–4	2–4	2–1	0–1	2–1	0 / 22	17–22	44%

=== Mixed Doubles ===
Tournament	2013	2014	2015	2016	2017	2018	2019	2020	2021	2022	2023	2024	2025	SR	W–L	Win %
Grand Slam tournaments
Australian Open	1R	A	2R	1R	1R	A	A	1R	1R	1R	1R	1R	1R	0 / 10	1–10	9%
French Open	A	A	A	A	A	A	A	NH	1R	A	A	A		0 / 1	0–1	0%
Wimbledon	A	A	A	A	A	A	A	NH	A	A	A	A		0 / 0	0–0	–
US Open	A	A	A	A	A	A	A	NH	1R	A	A	A		0 / 1	0–1	0%
Win–loss	0–1	0–0	1–1	0–1	0–1	0–0	0–0	0–1	0–3	0–1	0–1	0–1	0–1	0 / 12	1–12	8%
