= Keio Challenger =

Yokohama Keio Challenger
- 2025 Yokohama Keio Challenger

Tournament information
- Event name: Yokohama Keio Challenger International Tennis Tournament supported by Mita Kosan
- Location: Yokohama, Japan
- Venue: Mamushidani Tennis Courts, Keio University
- Surface: Hard
- Website: Website
ATP Tour
- Category: ATP Challenger Tour
- Draw: 32S/32Q/16D
- Prize money: $100,000 (2025), $50,000+H
WTA Tour
- Category: ITF Women's Circuit
- Draw: 32S/32Q/16D
- Prize money: $40,000

The Yokohama Keio Challenger by Mita Kosan is a professional tennis tournament played on hardcourts. It is currently part of the ATP Challenger Tour and the ITF Women's Circuit. Having been held in Yokohama, Japan since 1999, the women's edition of the event was introduced in 2017.

== Past finals ==
=== Men's singles ===
Year	Champion	Runner-up	Score
2025	(Japan) Rei Sakamoto	(Japan) Kaichi Uchida	4–6, 7–6^{(7–4)}, 6–4
2024	(Japan) Yuta Shimizu	(Australia) Li Tu	6–7^{(4–7)}, 6–4, 6–2
2023	(Japan) Yosuke Watanuki	(Japan) Yuta Shimizu	7–6^{(7–5)}, 6–4
2022	(Australia) Christopher O'Connell	(Japan) Yosuke Watanuki	6–1, 6–7^{(5–7)}, 6–3
2020–21	Not held		
2019	(South Korea) Kwon Soon-woo	(Germany) Oscar Otte	7–6^{(7–4)}, 6–3
2018	(Japan) Yasutaka Uchiyama	(Japan) Tatsuma Ito	2–6, 6–3, 6–4
2017	(Japan) Yūichi Sugita	(South Korea) Kwon Soon-woo	6–4, 2–6, 7–6^{(7–2)}
2016	Not held		
2015	(Japan) Taro Daniel	(Japan) Go Soeda	4–6, 6–3, 6–3
2014	(Australia) John Millman	(United Kingdom) Kyle Edmund	6–4, 6–4
2013	(Australia) Matthew Ebden	(Japan) Go Soeda	2–6, 7–6^{(7–3)}, 6–3
2012	(Italy) Matteo Viola	(Bosnia and Herzegovina) Mirza Bašić	7–6^{(7–3)}, 6–3
2010–11	Not held		
2009	(Japan) Takao Suzuki	(Austria) Martin Fischer	6–4, 7–6^{(7−5)}
2008	(South Korea) Lee Hyung-taik	(Japan) Go Soeda	7–5, 6–3
2007	(Israel) Dudi Sela	(Japan) Takao Suzuki	6–7^{(5−7)}, 6–4, 6–2
2003–06	Not held		
2002	(South Korea) Lee Hyung-taik	(Netherlands) John van Lottum	2–6, 7–6^{(7−2)}, 7–6^{(8−6)}
2001	(Japan) Takao Suzuki	(Japan) Gouichi Motomura	6–2, 6–7^{(5−7)}, 7–6^{(7−4)}
2000	(Philippines) Eric Taino	(Austria) Julian Knowle	7–6^{(7−5)}, 6–4
1999	(South Korea) Lee Hyung-taik	(Thailand) Paradorn Srichaphan	6–3, 6–0

=== Men's doubles ===
Year	Champions	Runners-up	Score
2025	(Austria) Neil Oberleitner (Czech Republic) Michael Vrbenský	(Japan) Masamichi Imamura (Japan) Ryuki Matsuda	7–6^{(8–6)}, 6–1
2024	(Lebanon) Benjamin Hassan (India) Saketh Myneni	(Australia) Blake Bayldon (Australia) Calum Puttergill	6–2, 6–4
2023	(Sweden) Filip Bergevi (Netherlands) Mick Veldheer	(Chinese Taipei) Ray Ho (Australia) Calum Puttergill	2–6, 7–5, [11–9]
2022	(Romania) Victor Vlad Cornea (Philippines) Ruben Gonzales	(Japan) Tomoya Fujiwara (Japan) Masamichi Imamura	7–5, 6–3
2020–21	Not held		
2019	(Tunisia) Moez Echargui (Tunisia) Skander Mansouri	(Australia) Max Purcell (Australia) Luke Saville	7–6^{(8–6)}, 6–7^{(3–7)}, [10–7]
2018	(Germany) Tobias Kamke (Germany) Tim Pütz	(Thailand) Sanchai Ratiwatana (Thailand) Sonchat Ratiwatana	3–6, 7–5, [12–10]
2017	(Croatia) Marin Draganja (Croatia) Tomislav Draganja	(Belgium) Joris De Loore (Australia) Luke Saville	4–6, 6–3, [10–4]
2016	Not held		
2015	(Thailand) Sanchai Ratiwatana (Thailand) Sonchat Ratiwatana	(Italy) Riccardo Ghedin (Chinese Taipei) Yi Chu-huan	6–4, 6–4
2014	(United States) Bradley Klahn (Australia) Matt Reid	(New Zealand) Marcus Daniell (New Zealand) Artem Sitak	4–6, 6–4, [10–7]
2013	(United States) Bradley Klahn (New Zealand) Michael Venus	(Thailand) Sanchai Ratiwatana (Thailand) Sonchat Ratiwatana	7–5, 6–1
2012	(India) Prakash Amritraj (Austria) Philipp Oswald	(Thailand) Sanchai Ratiwatana (Thailand) Sonchat Ratiwatana	6–3, 6–4
2010–11	Not Held		
2009	(Chinese Taipei) Yang Tsung-hua (Chinese Taipei) Yi Chu-huan	(Kazakhstan) Alexey Kedryuk (Japan) Junn Mitsuhashi	6–7^{(9−11)}, 6–3, [12–10]
2008	(Czech Republic) Tomáš Cakl (Slovakia) Marek Semjan	(United States) Brendan Evans (Austria) Martin Slanar	6–3, 7–6^{(7−1)}
2007	(Japan) Hiroki Kondo (Japan) Go Soeda	(Japan) Satoshi Iwabuchi (Japan) Toshihide Matsui	6–7^{(5−7)}, 6–3, [11–9]
2003–06	Not held		
2002	(Chinese Taipei) Lu Yen-hsun (Thailand) Danai Udomchoke	(Croatia) Ivo Karlović (Australia) Mark Nielsen	7–6^{(7−5)}, 6–3
2001	(Japan) Takao Suzuki (Japan) Mitsuru Takada	(Switzerland) Marco Chiudinelli (Germany) Sebastian Jäger	6–3, 6–4
2000	(Switzerland) Yves Allegro (Austria) Julian Knowle	(Australia) Tim Crichton (Australia) Ashley Fisher	6–3, 7–6^{(7−2)}
1999	(Japan) Satoshi Iwabuchi (Japan) Thomas Shimada	(United States) Michael Joyce (United Kingdom) Kyle Spencer	6–2, 6–4

=== Women's singles ===
Year	Champion	Runner-up	Score
2024	Aliona Falei	(United States) Hina Inoue	3–6, 6–1, 6–4
2023	Aliona Falei	(Japan) Ayano Shimizu	6–3, 7–5
2022	(South Korea) Han Na-lae	(Japan) Miyu Kato	7–5, 6–0
2021	Not held		
2020	(Japan) Yuriko Miyazaki	(Japan) Mai Hontama	7–5, 5–7, 6–2
2019	(Belgium) Greet Minnen	(Romania) Elena-Gabriela Ruse	6–4, 6–1
2018	(Russia) Veronika Kudermetova	(United Kingdom) Harriet Dart	6–2, 6–4
2017	(Japan) Akiko Omae	(Japan) Mayo Hibi	7–5, 6–2

=== Women's doubles ===
Year	Champions	Runners-up	Score
2024	(Japan) Momoko Kobori (Japan) Ayano Shimizu	(Chinese Taipei) Cho I-hsuan (Chinese Taipei) Cho Yi-tsen	6–4, 7–6^{(7–2)}
2023	(Chinese Taipei) Liang En-shuo (China) Tang Qianhui	(Japan) Aoi Ito (Japan) Natsumi Kawaguchi	Walkover
2022	(Japan) Saki Imamura (Japan) Naho Sato	(South Korea) Han Na-lae (Japan) Mai Hontama	6–4, 4–6, [10–5]
2021	Not held		
2020	(Japan) Robu Kajitani (Japan) Naho Sato	(Japan) Erina Hayashi (Japan) Kanako Morisaki	1–6, 6–4, [10–8]
2019	(South Korea) Choi Ji-hee (South Korea) Han Na-lae	(India) Rutuja Bhosale (Japan) Akiko Omae	6–1, 7–5
2018	(United Kingdom) Laura Robson (Hungary) Fanny Stollár	(Japan) Momoko Kobori (Japan) Chihiro Muramatsu	5–7, 6–2, [10–4]
2017	(Japan) Ayaka Okuno (Japan) Erika Sema	(Japan) Kanako Morisaki (Japan) Minori Yonehara	6–4, 6–4
