= 2017 Levene Gouldin & Thompson Tennis Challenger – Doubles =

Doubles
- 2017 Levene Gouldin & Thompson Tennis Challenger

Final
- Champions: (United States) Denis Kudla (United States) Daniel Nguyen
- Runners-up: (Australia) Jarryd Chaplin (Australia) Luke Saville
- Score: 6–3, 7–6^{(7–5)}

Events
Singles	Doubles
← 2016 ·	Levene Gouldin & Thompson Tennis Challenger	· 2018 →

Matt Reid and John-Patrick Smith were the defending champions but chose not to defend their title.

Denis Kudla and Daniel Nguyen won the title after defeating Jarryd Chaplin and Luke Saville 6–3, 7–6^{(7–5)} in the final.

== Seeds ==
1. (Australia) Alex Bolt / (Australia) Andrew Whittington (quarterfinals)
2. (China) Gong Maoxin / (China) Zhang Ze (semifinals, withdrew)
3. (South Africa) Ruan Roelofse / (Indonesia) Christopher Rungkat (quarterfinals)
4. (Australia) Jarryd Chaplin / (Australia) Luke Saville (final)

== Draw ==
=== Key ===
- Q = Qualifier
- WC = Wild card
- LL = Lucky loser
- Alt = Alternate
- SE = Special exempt
- PR = Protected ranking
- ITF = ITF entry
- JE = Junior exempt
- w/o = Walkover
- r = Retired
- d = Defaulted
- SR = Special ranking

First round
1	(Australia) A Bolt (Australia) A Whittington	6	6
(United States) A El Mihdawy (Brazil) JP Sorgi	3	4
(Israel) Dekel Bar (India) R Ramanathan	6^{5}	6^{9}
(United States) D Kudla (United States) D Nguyen	7^{7}	7^{11}
3	(South Africa) R Roelofse (Indonesia) C Rungkat	6	5	[10]
(United States) M Giron (New Zealand) J Statham	4	7	[4]
(United Kingdom) C Norrie (United States) A Rybakov	6	6
WC	(United States) John Lamble (United States) Evan Song	3	3
WC	(United States) Connor Farren (United States) R Sarmiento	6	6
WC	(United Kingdom) James Hignett (United States) William Mendler	2	2
(United States) R Galloway (United States) A Lawson	7^{7}	5	[4]
4	(Australia) Jarryd Chaplin (Australia) L Saville	6^{5}	7	[10]
(Israel) E Leshem (Australia) A Santillan
(United States) K King (Mexico) MÁ Reyes-Varela	w/o
(United Kingdom) E Corrie (Slovenia) B Rola	4	0
2	(China) M Gong (China) Z Zhang	6	6

Quarterfinals
1	(Australia) A Bolt (Australia) A Whittington	7^{7}	2	[9]
(United States) D Kudla (United States) D Nguyen	6^{4}	6	[11]
3	(South Africa) R Roelofse (Indonesia) C Rungkat	6^{1}	2
(United Kingdom) C Norrie (United States) A Rybakov	7^{7}	6
WC	(United States) C Farren (United States) R Sarmiento	4	1
4	(Australia) J Chaplin (Australia) L Saville	6	6
(United States) K King (Mexico) MÁ Reyes-Varela	4	6	[9]
2	(China) M Gong (China) Z Zhang	6	3	[11]

Semifinals
(United States) D Kudla (United States) D Nguyen	6	6
(United Kingdom) C Norrie (United States) A Rybakov	2	2
4	(Australia) J Chaplin (Australia) L Saville	w/o
2	(China) M Gong (China) Z Zhang

Final
(United States) D Kudla (United States) D Nguyen	6	7^{7}
4	(Australia) J Chaplin (Australia) L Saville	3	6^{5}
