= 2017 Levene Gouldin & Thompson Tennis Challenger – Singles =

Singles
- 2017 Levene Gouldin & Thompson Tennis Challenger

Final
- Champion: (United Kingdom) Cameron Norrie
- Runner-up: (Australia) Jordan Thompson
- Score: 6–4, 0–6, 6–4

Events
Singles	Doubles
← 2016 ·	Levene Gouldin & Thompson Tennis Challenger	· 2018 →

Darian King was the defending champion but chose not to defend his title.

Cameron Norrie won the title after defeating Jordan Thompson 6–4, 0–6, 6–4 in the final.

== Seeds ==
1. (Australia) Jordan Thompson (final)
2. (Kazakhstan) Alexander Bublik (quarterfinals)
3. (India) Ramkumar Ramanathan (first round)
4. (Australia) Akira Santillan (second round, retired)
5. (United States) Michael Mmoh (second round)
6. (United States) Denis Kudla (second round)
7. (Australia) Andrew Whittington (first round)
8. (Slovenia) Blaž Rola (quarterfinals)

== Draw ==
=== Key ===
- Q = Qualifier
- WC = Wild card
- LL = Lucky loser
- Alt = Alternate
- SE = Special exempt
- PR = Protected ranking
- ITF = ITF entry
- JE = Junior exempt
- w/o = Walkover
- r = Retired
- d = Defaulted
- SR = Special ranking

=== Finals ===
Semifinals
1	(Australia) Jordan Thompson	4	6	6
WC	(United States) William Blumberg	6	3	3
(United Kingdom) Cameron Norrie	6	6
(United States) Christian Harrison	2	2

Final
1	(Australia) Jordan Thompson	4	6	4
(United Kingdom) Cameron Norrie	6	0	6

=== Top half ===
First round
1	(Australia) J Thompson	7^{7}	6
(United States) E King	6^{1}	4
WC	(United States) A Rybakov	6	6
Q	(United States) A El Mihdawy	3	2
Alt	(United Kingdom) E Corrie	6	6
Q	(Israel) Dekel Bar	3	2
(Germany) D Köpfer	6	5	6
7	(Australia) A Whittington	4	7	2
4	(Australia) A Santillan	3	7^{7}	6
Q	(United States) Evan Song	6	6^{4}	0
(China) Z Zhang	6	7^{7}
(New Zealand) J Statham	4	6^{4}
WC	(United States) W Blumberg	7	6
(Australia) L Saville	5	3
(Brazil) JP Sorgi	2	4
6	(United States) D Kudla	6	6

Second round
1	(Australia) J Thompson	6	6
WC	(United States) A Rybakov	3	3
Alt	(United Kingdom) E Corrie	6^{2}	4
(Germany) D Köpfer	7^{7}	6
4	(Australia) A Santillan	4	1^{r}
(China) Z Zhang	6	4
WC	(United States) W Blumberg	6	6
6	(United States) D Kudla	3	2

Quarterfinals
1	(Australia) J Thompson	6	6
(Germany) D Köpfer	2	3
(China) Z Zhang
WC	(United States) W Blumberg	w/o

Semifinals
1	(Australia) J Thompson	4	6	6
WC	(United States) W Blumberg	6	3	3

=== Bottom half ===
First round
8	(Slovenia) B Rola	6	7^{7}
WC	(United States) JC Aragone	4	6^{2}
(Israel) E Leshem	3	2
(Australia) A Bolt	6	6
WC	(United States) B Holt	3	6	3
(United States) D Nguyen	6	2	6
(United Kingdom) C Norrie	7^{7}	6
3	(India) R Ramanathan	6^{3}	2
5	(United States) M Mmoh	7	7
(United States) M Giron	5	5
(United States) C Harrison	6	6^{4}	6
Q	(United States) E Quigley	3	7^{7}	4
PR	(United States) K King	2	7^{10}	7
(United States) R Sarmiento	6	6^{8}	5
LL	(United States) Connor Farren	5	6	5
2	(Kazakhstan) A Bublik	7	4	7

Second round
8	(Slovenia) B Rola	6	6
(Australia) A Bolt	3	2
(United States) D Nguyen	3	3
(United Kingdom) C Norrie	6	6
5	(United States) M Mmoh	4	3
(United States) C Harrison	6	6
PR	(United States) K King	6	3	3
2	(Kazakhstan) A Bublik	2	6	6

Quarterfinals
8	(Slovenia) B Rola	6	4	4
(United Kingdom) C Norrie	3	6	6
(United States) C Harrison	6	6^{2}	7
2	(Kazakhstan) A Bublik	4	7^{7}	5

Semifinals
(United Kingdom) C Norrie	6	6
(United States) C Harrison	2	2
