= 2014 Levene Gouldin & Thompson Tennis Challenger – Singles =

Singles
- 2014 Levene Gouldin & Thompson Tennis Challenger

Final
- Champion: (Ukraine) Sergiy Stakhovsky
- Runner-up: (United States) Wayne Odesnik
- Score: 6–4, 7–6^{(11–9)}

Events
Singles	Doubles
- Levene Gouldin & Thompson Tennis Challenger

Alex Kuznetsov was the defending champion but decided not to participate.

Sergiy Stakhovsky won the title, defeating Wayne Odesnik 6–4, 7–6^{(11–9)} in the final.

== Seeds ==
1. (United States) Bradley Klahn (quarterfinals, withdrew)
2. (Ukraine) Sergiy Stakhovsky (champion)
3. (United States) Denis Kudla (second round, withdrew)
4. (Romania) Marius Copil (first round)
5. (Ukraine) Illya Marchenko (first round)
6. (United States) Rhyne Williams (second round)
7. (United States) Austin Krajicek (second round)
8. (United States) Wayne Odesnik (final)

== Draw ==
Key

- Q = Qualifier
- WC = Wild card
- LL = Lucky loser
- Alt = Alternate
- ITF = ITF entry
- PR = Protected ranking
- SR = Special ranking
- SE = Special exempt
- JE = Junior exempt
- JR = Junior Accelerator Programme entrant
- CO = College Accelerator Programme entrant
- NG = Next Gen Accelerator Program entrant
- w/o = Walkover
- r = Retired
- d = Defaulted

=== Finals ===
Semifinals
8	(United States) Wayne Odesnik	6	6
(Zimbabwe) Takanyi Garanganga	1	2
(United Kingdom) Daniel Cox	2	4
2	(Ukraine) Sergiy Stakhovsky	6	6

Final
8	(United States) Wayne Odesnik	4	6^{9}
2	(Ukraine) Sergiy Stakhovsky	6	7^{11}

=== Top half ===
First round
1	(United States) B Klahn	5	6	6
(Australia) J Thompson	7	1	4
Q	(United States) S Bangoura	6	5	6
(Argentina) F Mena	0	7	2
(Italy) Erik Crepaldi	6	7
LL	(Uzbekistan) S Ikramov	3	5
(United States) D Novikov	6	5	4
8	(United States) W Odesnik	3	7	6
3	(United States) D Kudla	7^{7}	6
(United States) M Krueger	6^{3}	3
(United States) M McDonald	6	4	4
(United States) E Escobedo	3	6	6
(Zimbabwe) T Garanganga	4	6	6
WC	(United States) M Giron	6	4	3
(United States) R Ginepri	6	4	6^{5}
6	(United States) R Williams	4	6	7^{7}

Second round
1	(United States) B Klahn	6	7^{12}
(United States) S Bangoura	3	6^{10}
(Italy) E Crepaldi	3	0
8	(United States) W Odesnik	6	6
3	(United States) D Kudla
(United States) E Escobedo	w/o
(Zimbabwe) T Garanganga	6	6^{3}	6
6	(United States) R Williams	3	7^{7}	2

Quarterfinals
1	(United States) B Klahn
8	(United States) W Odesnik	w/o
(United States) E Escobedo	6	5	4
(Zimbabwe) T Garanganga	2	7	6

Semifinals
8	(United States) W Odesnik	6	6
(Zimbabwe) T Garanganga	1	2

=== Bottom half ===
First round
5	(Ukraine) I Marchenko	6^{2}	1
(Barbados) D King	7^{7}	6
(United States) Dennis Nevolo	6	7^{7}
(United Kingdom) D Smethurst	3	6^{3}
(United Kingdom) D Cox	6	6
(United States) J Jenkins	3	2
(United States) J Donaldson	7	6
4/Q	(Romania) M Copil	5	1
7	(United States) A Krajicek	7	6
WC	(United States) Winston Lin	5	4
(Australia) T Kokkinakis	6	6
Q	(United States) R Sarmiento	2	2
WC	(United States) R Shane	4	4
Q	(United States) D Nguyen	6	6
(United States) E King	1	4
2	(Ukraine) S Stakhovsky	6	6

Second round
(Barbados) D King	2	6	6
(United States) D Nevolo	6	4	4
(United Kingdom) D Cox	2	6	6
(United States) J Donaldson	6	4	4
7	(United States) A Krajicek	2	4
(Australia) T Kokkinakis	6	6
Q	(United States) D Nguyen	4	4
2	(Ukraine) S Stakhovsky	6	6

Quarterfinals
(Barbados) D King	3	2
(United Kingdom) D Cox	6	6
(Australia) T Kokkinakis	3	2
2	(Ukraine) S Stakhovsky	6	6

Semifinals
(United Kingdom) D Cox	2	4
2	(Ukraine) S Stakhovsky	6	6
