= 2011 Levene Gouldin & Thompson Tennis Challenger – Doubles =

Doubles
- 2011 Levene Gouldin & Thompson Tennis Challenger

Final
- Champions: (Colombia) Juan Sebastián Cabal; (Colombia) Robert Farah
- Runners-up: (Philippines) Treat Conrad Huey; (Denmark) Frederik Nielsen
- Score: 6–4, 6–3

Events
Singles	Doubles
← 2010 ·	Levene Gouldin & Thompson Tennis Challenger	· 2012 →

Treat Conrad Huey and Dominic Inglot were the defending champions, but Inglot decided not to participate. Huey partnered up with Frederik Nielsen.

Juan Sebastián Cabal and Robert Farah won this tournament. They defeated Treat Conrad Huey and Frederik Nielsen 6–4, 6–3 in the final.

== Seeds ==
1. (Colombia) Juan Sebastián Cabal / (Colombia) Robert Farah (champions)
2. (Philippines) Treat Conrad Huey / (Denmark) Frederik Nielsen (final)
3. (Australia) Jordan Kerr / (United States) David Martin (semifinals)
4. (Australia) Carsten Ball / (Australia) Chris Guccione (semifinals)

== Draw ==
=== Key ===
- Q = Qualifier
- WC = Wild card
- LL = Lucky loser
- Alt = Alternate
- SE = Special exempt
- PR = Protected ranking
- ITF = ITF entry
- JE = Junior exempt
- w/o = Walkover
- r = Retired
- d = Defaulted
- SR = Special ranking

=== Draw ===
First round

Quarterfinals

Semifinals

Final

1
- (Colombia) JS Cabal
- (Colombia) R Farah
6
6

- (Spain) A Brugués Davi
- (Bulgaria) D Kutrovsky
0
3

1
- (Colombia) JS Cabal
- (Colombia) R Farah
6
1
[10]

- (United States) A Kuznetsov
- (Australia) J Sirianni
6
6

- (United States) A Kuznetsov
- (Australia) J Sirianni
2
6
[8]

WC
(United States) William Mendler
(United States) Alex Tsai
2
3

1
- (Colombia) JS Cabal
- (Colombia) R Farah
1
6
[10]

3
- (Australia) J Kerr
- (United States) D Martin
6
6

3
- (Australia) J Kerr
- (United States) D Martin
6
4
[6]

WC
- (United States) Anthony Assal
- (Brazil) B Semenzato
2
1

3
- (Australia) J Kerr
- (United States) D Martin
7
6

- (Japan) Y Sugita
- (Slovenia) G Žemlja
6
6

- (Japan) Y Sugita
- (Slovenia) G Žemlja
5
3

Alt
(United States) Ronald McKenzie
(United States) John Valenti
1
0

1
- (Colombia) JS Cabal
- (Colombia) R Farah
6
6

- (Argentina) F Bagnis
- (Brazil) F Romboli
6
6

2
- (Philippines) TC Huey
- (Denmark) F Nielsen
4
3

Alt
(United States) Krasimir Kolev
(Belarus) Tsimafey Senkevich
0
3

- (Argentina) F Bagnis
- (Brazil) F Romboli
3
2

- (Moldova) R Borvanov
- (New Zealand) M Venus
6^{5}
2

4
- (Australia) C Ball
- (Australia) C Guccione
6
6

4
- (Australia) C Ball
- (Australia) C Guccione
7^{7}
6

4
- (Australia) C Ball
- (Australia) C Guccione
4
7^{7}
[7]

- (Chile) P Capdeville
- (Chile) N Massú
7^{7}
1
[12]

2
- (Philippines) TC Huey
- (Denmark) F Nielsen
6
6^{4}
[10]

- (Belgium) R Bemelmans
- (France) V Millot
6^{2}
6
[10]

- (Chile) P Capdeville
- (Chile) N Massú
2
1

- (Barbados) D King
- (Barbados) H Lewis
4
4

2
- (Philippines) TC Huey
- (Denmark) F Nielsen
6
6

2
- (Philippines) TC Huey
- (Denmark) F Nielsen
6
6
