= 2011 Levene Gouldin & Thompson Tennis Challenger – Singles =

Singles
- 2011 Levene Gouldin & Thompson Tennis Challenger

Final
- Champion: (Chile) Paul Capdeville
- Runner-up: (United States) Wayne Odesnik
- Score: 7–6^{(7–4)}, 6–3

Events
Singles	Doubles
← 2010 ·	Levene Gouldin & Thompson Tennis Challenger	· 2012 →

Kei Nishikori was the defending champion, but decided not to participate.

Paul Capdeville defeated Wayne Odesnik 7–6^{(7–4)}, 6–3 in the final to win this tournament.

== Seeds ==
1. (South Africa) Izak van der Merwe (semifinals)
2. (Chile) Paul Capdeville (champion)
3. (United States) Bobby Reynolds (withdrew)
4. (Slovenia) Grega Žemlja (semifinals)
5. (Brazil) Rogério Dutra da Silva (first round)
6. (Belgium) Ruben Bemelmans (quarterfinals)
7. (Spain) Arnau Brugués-Davi (first round)
8. (United States) Wayne Odesnik (final)
9. (Japan) Yuichi Sugita (first round)

== Draw ==
=== Key ===
- Q = Qualifier
- WC = Wild card
- LL = Lucky loser
- Alt = Alternate
- SE = Special exempt
- PR = Protected ranking
- ITF = ITF entry
- JE = Junior exempt
- w/o = Walkover
- r = Retired
- d = Defaulted
- SR = Special ranking

=== Finals ===
Semifinals
1	(South Africa) Izak van der Merwe	2	7^{8}	4
8	(United States) Wayne Odesnik	6	6^{6}	6
4	(Slovenia) Grega Žemlja	1	2
2	(Chile) Paul Capdeville	6	6

Final
8	(United States) Wayne Odesnik	6^{4}	3
2	(Chile) Paul Capdeville	7^{7}	6

=== Top half ===
First round
1	(South Africa) I van der Merwe	6^{2}	7^{7}	6
(Argentina) F Bagnis	7^{7}	6^{3}	3
Q	(Australia) B Mitchell	6^{5}	0
Q	(United States) A El Mihdawy	7^{7}	6
Alt	(Moldova) R Borvanov	6^{5}	4
Alt	(United States) R Ram	7^{7}	6
(Brazil) F Romboli	1	1
6	(Belgium) R Bemelmans	6	6
9	(Japan) Y Sugita	4	6	2
(Russia) E Donskoy	6	3	6
(Denmark) F Nielsen	6	6
Alt	(New Zealand) M Venus	3	4
(Australia) C Guccione	6^{4}	7	3
(United States) A Kuznetsov	7^{7}	5	6
WC	(United States) T Sandgren	4	5
8	(United States) W Odesnik	6	7

Second round
1	(South Africa) I van der Merwe	6	7
Q	(United States) A El Mihdawy	3	5
Alt	(United States) R Ram	6^{3}	2
6	(Belgium) R Bemelmans	7^{7}	6
(Russia) E Donskoy	7^{9}	4	6
(Denmark) F Nielsen	6^{7}	6	3
(United States) A Kuznetsov	4	4
8	(United States) W Odesnik	6	6

Quarterfinals
1	(South Africa) I van der Merwe	7^{8}	1	6
6	(Belgium) R Bemelmans	6^{6}	6	3
(Russia) E Donskoy	3	3
8	(United States) W Odesnik	6	6

Semifinals
1	(South Africa) I van der Merwe	2	7^{8}	4
8	(United States) W Odesnik	6	6^{6}	6

=== Bottom half ===
First round
7	(Spain) A Brugués-Davi	0	6^{5}
(Australia) G Jones	6	7^{7}
(Colombia) JS Cabal	4	4
WC	(Chile) N Massú	6	6
(Colombia) R Farah	4	4
(France) V Millot	6	6
WC	(United States) Alex Domijan	3	4
4	(Slovenia) G Žemlja	6	6
5	(Brazil) R Dutra da Silva	1	2
Q	(Bulgaria) D Kutrovsky	6	6
(Australia) C Ball	6	6
Q	(Slovenia) L Gregorc	3	4
(United Kingdom) J Ward	6	6
LL	(Brazil) B Semenzato	2	1
WC	(United States) R Williams	4	4
2	(Chile) P Capdeville	6	6

Second round
(Australia) G Jones	5	6	6
WC	(Chile) N Massú	7	2	3
(France) V Millot	4	4
4	(Slovenia) G Žemlja	6	6
Q	(Bulgaria) D Kutrovsky	3	6^{3}
(Australia) C Ball	6	7^{7}
(United Kingdom) J Ward	6	1	4
2	(Chile) P Capdeville	1	6	6

Quarterfinals
(Australia) G Jones	2	0
4	(Slovenia) G Žemlja	6	6
(Australia) C Ball	6^{4}	4
2	(Chile) P Capdeville	7^{7}	6

Semifinals
4	(Slovenia) G Žemlja	1	2
2	(Chile) P Capdeville	6	6
