= 2014 Levene Gouldin & Thompson Tennis Challenger – Doubles =

Doubles
- 2014 Levene Gouldin & Thompson Tennis Challenger

Final
- Champion: (United Kingdom) Daniel Cox (United Kingdom) Daniel Smethurst
- Runner-up: (Romania) Marius Copil (Ukraine) Sergiy Stakhovsky
- Score: 6–7^{(3–7)}, 6–2, [10–6]

Events
| Singles | Doubles |
- Levene Gouldin & Thompson Tennis Challenger

Bradley Klahn and Michael Venus were the defending champions, but Venus chose to compete in the ATP World Tour. Bradley Klahn played alongside Jordan Thompson and they lost in the semifinals.

Daniel Cox and Daniel Smethurst won the title, defeating Marius Copil and Sergiy Stakhovsky in the final, 6–7^{(3–7)}, 6–2, [10–6].

== Seeds ==
1. (United States) Sekou Bangoura / (United States) Evan King (first round)
2. (Australia) Thanasi Kokkinakis / (United States) Denis Kudla (quarterfinals, withdrew)
3. (United States) Jarmere Jenkins / (United States) Rhyne Williams (semifinals)
4. (United States) Bradley Klahn / (Australia) Jordan Thompson (semifinals, withdrew)

== Draw ==
Key

- Q = Qualifier
- WC = Wild card
- LL = Lucky loser
- Alt = Alternate
- ITF = ITF entry
- PR = Protected ranking
- SR = Special ranking
- SE = Special exempt
- JE = Junior exempt
- JR = Junior Accelerator Programme entrant
- CO = College Accelerator Programme entrant
- NG = Next Gen Accelerator Program entrant
- w/o = Walkover
- r = Retired
- d = Defaulted

=== Draw ===
First round
1 | (United States) S Bangoura (United States) E King | 1 | 6 | [3]
(United Kingdom) D Cox (United Kingdom) D Smethurst | 6 | 3 | [10]
WC | (Zimbabwe) T Garanganga (Zimbabwe) Takura Happy | 6 | 6
Q | (United States) Graham Alrutz (United States) Keith Whittingham | 4 | 3
4 | (United States) B Klahn (Australia) J Thompson | 7 | 7
(United States) R Shane (United States) C Thompson | 5 | 5
(Italy) Erik Crepaldi (Argentina) F Mena | 3 | 3
(United States) M Krueger (United States) M McDonald | 6 | 6
WC | (United States) Thomas Caputo (United States) Richard Del Nunzio | 3 | 6^{2}
(United States) D Nguyen (United States) R Sarmiento | 6 | 7^{7}
(United States) Dennis Nevolo (United States) D Novikov | 4 | 6 | [3]
3 | (United States) J Jenkins (United States) R Williams | 6 | 4 | [10]
WC | (Uzbekistan) S Ikramov (United States) Nail Khabiyev | 3 | 2
(Romania) M Copil (Ukraine) S Stakhovsky | 6 | 6
(United States) M Giron (United States) A Krajicek | 3 | 5
2 | (Australia) T Kokkinakis (United States) D Kudla | 6 | 7

Quarterfinals
(United Kingdom) D Cox (United Kingdom) D Smethurst | 6 | 6
WC | (Zimbabwe) T Garanganga (Zimbabwe) T Happy | 3 | 4
4 | (United States) B Klahn (Australia) J Thompson | 6 | 6
(United States) M Krueger (United States) M McDonald | 3 | 4
(United States) D Nguyen (United States) R Sarmiento | 2 | 6^{4}
3 | (United States) J Jenkins (United States) R Williams | 6 | 7^{7}
(Romania) M Copil (Ukraine) S Stakhovsky | w/o
2 | (Australia) T Kokkinakis (United States) D Kudla

Semifinals
(United Kingdom) D Cox (United Kingdom) D Smethurst | w/o
4 | (United States) B Klahn (Australia) J Thompson
3 | (United States) J Jenkins (United States) R Williams | 4 | 5
(Romania) M Copil (Ukraine) S Stakhovsky | 6 | 7

Final
(United Kingdom) D Cox (United Kingdom) D Smethurst | 6^{3} | 6 | [10]
(Romania) M Copil (Ukraine) S Stakhovsky | 7^{7} | 2 | [6]
