= 2014 Levene Gouldin & Thompson Tennis Challenger =

- Date: 14–20 July
- Edition: 21st
- Surface: Hard court
- Location: Binghamton, United States

Champions

Singles
- (Ukraine) Sergiy Stakhovsky

Doubles
- (United Kingdom) Daniel Cox / (United Kingdom) Daniel Smethurst
- Levene Gouldin & Thompson Tennis Challenger

The 2014 Levene Gouldin & Thompson Tennis Challenger was a professional tennis tournament played on hard court. It was the 21st edition of the tournament which was part of the 2014 ATP Challenger Tour. It took place in Binghamton, United States between 14 and 20 July 2014.

== Singles main-draw entrants ==
=== Seeds ===
Country	Player	Rank^{1}	Seed
USA	Bradley Klahn	74	1
UKR	Sergiy Stakhovsky	88	2
USA	Denis Kudla	120	3
ROU	Marius Copil	161	4
UKR	Illya Marchenko	180	5
USA	Rhyne Williams	198	6
USA	Austin Krajicek	208	7
USA	Wayne Odesnik	216	8

- ^{1} Rankings are as of July 8, 2014.

=== Other entrants ===
The following players received wildcards into the singles main draw:

- (United States) Marcos Giron
- (United States) Austin Krajicek
- (United States) Winston Lin
- (United States) Ryan Shane

The following players received entry from the qualifying draw:

- (United States) Sekou Bangoura
- (Romania) Marius Copil
- (United States) Raymond Sarmiento
- (United States) Daniel Nguyen

== Champions ==
=== Men's singles ===
- (Ukraine) Sergiy Stakhovsky def. (United States) Wayne Odesnik 6–4, 7–6^{(11–9)}

=== Men's doubles ===
- (United Kingdom) Daniel Cox / (United Kingdom) Daniel Smethurst def. (Romania) Marius Copil / (Ukraine) Sergiy Stakhovsky 6–7^{(3–7)}, 6–2, [10–6]
