= 2009 Levene Gouldin & Thompson Tennis Challenger – Singles =

Singles
- 2009 Levene Gouldin & Thompson Tennis Challenger

Final
- Champion: (Chile) Paul Capdeville
- Runner-up: (South Africa) Kevin Anderson
- Score: 7–6(7), 7–6(11)

Events
| Singles | Doubles |
| ← 2008 · | Levene Gouldin & Thompson Tennis Challenger | · 2010 → |

Paul Capdeville, the defending champion, defeated Kevin Anderson 7–6(7), 7–6(11) in the final.

== Seeds ==
1. (Uzbekistan) Denis Istomin (quarterfinals)
2. (Chile) Paul Capdeville (champion)
3. (Australia) ~~Chris Guccione~~ (withdrew due to an achilles injury)
4. (Cyprus) ~~Marcos Baghdatis~~ (withdrew due to a knee injury)
5. (Australia) Carsten Ball (first round)
6. (Israel) Harel Levy (semifinals)
7. (South Africa) Kevin Anderson (final)
8. (India) Somdev Devvarman (first round)

== Draw ==
=== Key ===
- Q = Qualifier
- WC = Wild card
- LL = Lucky loser
- Alt = Alternate
- SE = Special exempt
- PR = Protected ranking
- ITF = ITF entry
- JE = Junior exempt
- w/o = Walkover
- r = Retired
- d = Defaulted
- SR = Special ranking

=== Final four ===
Semifinals
6 | (Israel) Harel Levy | 4 | 4
7 | (South Africa) Kevin Anderson | 6 | 6
(South Africa) Rik de Voest | 4 | 6^{3}
2 | (Chile) Paul Capdeville | 6 | 7

Final
7 | (South Africa) Kevin Anderson | 6^{7} | 6^{11}
2 | (Chile) Paul Capdeville | 7 | 7

=== Top half ===
First round
1 | (Uzbekistan) D Istomin | 7 | 6
(United States) R Harrison | 5 | 0
(Japan) G Soeda | 6 | 7
Q | (Italy) L D'Agord | 4 | 5
(Australia) M Matosevic | 2 | 2 | r
WC | (United States) B Strode | 6 | 3
(United Kingdom) A Bogdanovic | 4 | 5
6 | (Israel) H Levy | 6 | 7
LL | (Lithuania) L Grigelis | 7 | 6^{5} | 6
(Poland) J Janowicz | 6^{5} | 7 | 3
(United States) M Yani | 3 | 4
WC | (United States) L Cook | 6 | 6
(Venezuela) J de Armas | 4 | 6 | 6
(United States) T Widom | 6 | 2 | 2
Q | (United States) R Kalmanovich | 1 | 2
7 | (South Africa) K Anderson | 6 | 6

Second round
1 | (Uzbekistan) D Istomin | 6 | 6
(Japan) G Soeda | 4 | 3
WC | (United States) B Strode | 4 | 6 | 4
6 | (Israel) H Levy | 6 | 3 | 6
LL | (Lithuania) L Grigelis | 1 | 7 | 4
WC | (United States) L Cook | 6 | 6^{4} | 6
(Venezuela) J de Armas | 4 | 1 | r
7 | (South Africa) K Anderson | 6 | 3

Quarterfinals
1 | (Uzbekistan) D Istomin | 4 | 6 | 4
6 | (Israel) H Levy | 6 | 4 | 6
WC | (United States) L Cook | 2 | 1 | r
7 | (South Africa) K Anderson | 6 | 4

Semifinals
6 | (Israel) H Levy | 4 | 4
7 | (South Africa) K Anderson | 6 | 6

=== Bottom half ===
First round
5 | (Australia) C Ball | 6 | 5 | 2
SE | (United States) T Smyczek | 4 | 7 | 6
(Slovenia) L Gregorc | 3 | 3
(South Africa) R de Voest | 6 | 6
(Russia) A Kudryavtsev | 6 | 7
(Italy) A Stoppini | 3 | 6^{7}
(Australia) N Lindahl | 3 | 7 | 2
LL | (Armenia) T Martirosyan | 6 | 6^{3} | 6
8 | (India) S Devvarman | 6^{3} | 5
(Ukraine) S Bubka | 7 | 7
WC | (India) P Amritraj | 6^{2} | 6 | 6
(United States) R DeHeart | 7 | 3 | 3
WC | (Philippines) C Mamiit | 4 | 1
Q | (Netherlands) I Sijsling | 6 | 6
ALT | (Japan) T Ito | 1 | 1
2 | (Chile) P Capdeville | 6 | 6

Second round
SE | (United States) T Smyczek | 6^{2} | 1
(South Africa) R de Voest | 7 | 6
(Russia) A Kudryavtsev | 3 | 5
LL | (Armenia) T Martirosyan | 6 | 7
(Ukraine) S Bubka | 6 | 4
WC | (India) P Amritraj | 3 | 2 | r
Q | (Netherlands) I Sijsling | 4 | 4
2 | (Chile) P Capdeville | 6 | 6

Quarterfinals
(South Africa) R de Voest | 6 | 6
LL | (Armenia) T Martirosyan | 3 | 2
(Ukraine) S Bubka | 4 | 3
2 | (Chile) P Capdeville | 6 | 6

Semifinals
(South Africa) R de Voest | 4 | 6^{3}
2 | (Chile) P Capdeville | 6 | 7
