= 2009 Levene Gouldin & Thompson Tennis Challenger – Doubles =

Doubles
- 2009 Levene Gouldin & Thompson Tennis Challenger

Final
- Champions: (South Africa) Rik de Voest; (United States) Scott Lipsky
- Runners-up: (Australia) Carsten Ball; (United States) Kaes Van't Hof
- Score: 7–6(2), 6–4

Events
Singles	Doubles
← 2008 ·	Levene Gouldin & Thompson Tennis Challenger	· 2010 →

Carsten Ball and Travis Rettenmaier were the defending champions, however only Ball tried to defend his title.
He partnered with Kaes Van't Hof, but they lost to Rik de Voest and Scott Lipsky 6–7(2), 4–6 in the final.

== Seeds ==
1. (South Africa) Rik de Voest / (United States) Scott Lipsky (champions)
2. (United Kingdom) Colin Fleming / (United Kingdom) Ken Skupski (first round)
3. (India) Prakash Amritraj / (Pakistan) Aisam-ul-Haq Qureshi (semifinals)
4. (India) Harsh Mankad / (United States) David Martin (quarterfinals)

== Draw ==
=== Key ===
- Q = Qualifier
- WC = Wild card
- LL = Lucky loser
- Alt = Alternate
- SE = Special exempt
- PR = Protected ranking
- ITF = ITF entry
- JE = Junior exempt
- w/o = Walkover
- r = Retired
- d = Defaulted
- SR = Special ranking

=== Draw ===
First round

Quarterfinals

Semifinals

Finals

1
- (South Africa) R de Voest
- (United States) S Lipsky
6
2
[10]

- (United States) B Battistone
- (United States) D Battistone
4
6
[6]

1
- (South Africa) R de Voest
- (United States) S Lipsky
6
7

- (Israel) A Hadad
- (Israel) H Levy

- (Israel) A Hadad
- (Israel) H Levy
3
5

- (Australia) N Lindahl
- (Australia) M Matosevic
w/o

1
- (South Africa) R de Voest
- (United States) S Lipsky
7
6

3
- (India) P Amritraj
- (Pakistan) A-u-H Qureshi
6
6

3
- (India) P Amritraj
- (Pakistan) A-u-H Qureshi
6^{4}
3

WC
- (United States) L Cook
- (United States) JP Fruttero
3
2

3
- (India) P Amritraj
- (Pakistan) A-u-H Qureshi
6
7

LL
(United States) W Mendler
(United States) J Smith
3
1

- (Ukraine) S Bubka
- (Russia) A Kudryavtsev
3
6^{3}

- (Ukraine) S Bubka
- (Russia) A Kudryavtsev
6
6

1
- (South Africa) R de Voest
- (United States) S Lipsky
7
6

- (South Africa) K Anderson
- (United States) R DeHeart
6
6

- (Australia) C Ball
- (United States) K Van't Hof
6^{2}
4

- (India) S Devvarman
- (Philippines) TC Huey
3
2

- (South Africa) K Anderson
- (United States) R DeHeart
6
7

WC
- (Lithuania) L Grigelis
- (Italy) A Stoppini
6
3
[6]

4
- (India) H Mankad
- (United States) D Martin
3
5

4
- (India) H Mankad
- (United States) D Martin
3
6
[10]

- (South Africa) K Anderson
- (United States) R DeHeart
3
7
[6]

- (Japan) T Ito
- (Japan) G Soeda
6
6

- (Australia) C Ball
- (United States) K Van't Hof
6
6^{5}
[10]

Q
- (United States) A Assal
- (United States) C Schwartz
2
3

- (Japan) T Ito
- (Japan) G Soeda
2
1

- (Australia) C Ball
- (United States) K Van't Hof
6
6

- (Australia) C Ball
- (United States) K Van't Hof
6
6

2
- (United Kingdom) C Fleming
- (United Kingdom) K Skupski
1
4
