= 2017 Levene Gouldin & Thompson Tennis Challenger =

- Date: 24–30 July
- Edition: 24th
- Surface: Hard court
- Location: Binghamton, United States

Champions

Singles
- (United Kingdom) Cameron Norrie

Doubles
- (United States) Denis Kudla / (United States) Daniel Nguyen
← 2016 ·	Levene Gouldin & Thompson Tennis Challenger	· 2018 →

The 2017 Levene Gouldin & Thompson Tennis Challenger was a professional tennis tournament played on hard court. It was the 24th edition of the tournament which was part of the 2017 ATP Challenger Tour. It took place in Binghamton, United States between 24 and 30 July 2017.

== Singles main-draw entrants ==
=== Seeds ===
Country	Player	Rank^{1}	Seed
AUS	Jordan Thompson	80	1
KAZ	Alexander Bublik	124	2
IND	Ramkumar Ramanathan	168	3
AUS	Akira Santillan	171	4
USA	Michael Mmoh	173	5
USA	Denis Kudla	178	6
AUS	Andrew Whittington	197	7
SLO	Blaž Rola	241	8

- ^{1} Rankings are as of July 17, 2017.

=== Other entrants ===
The following players received wildcards into the singles main draw:

- (United States) JC Aragone
- (United States) William Blumberg
- (United States) Brandon Holt
- (United States) Alex Rybakov

The following player received entry into the singles main draw using a protected ranking:

- (United States) Kevin King

The following player received entry into the singles main draw as an alternate:

- (United Kingdom) Edward Corrie

The following players received entry from the qualifying draw:

- (Israel) Dekel Bar
- (United States) Adam El Mihdawy
- (United States) Eric Quigley
- (United States) Evan Song

The following player received entry as a lucky loser:

- (United States) Connor Farren

== Champions ==
=== Singles ===
- (United Kingdom) Cameron Norrie def. (Australia) Jordan Thompson 6–4, 0–6, 6–4.

=== Doubles ===
- (United States) Denis Kudla / (United States) Daniel Nguyen def. (Australia) Jarryd Chaplin / (Australia) Luke Saville 6–3, 7–6^{(7–5)}.
