= 2011 Levene Gouldin & Thompson Tennis Challenger =

- Date: 8–14 August
- Edition: 18th
- Surface: Hard
- Location: Binghamton, New York, United States

Champions

Singles
- (Chile) Paul Capdeville

Doubles
- (Colombia) Juan Sebastián Cabal /; (Colombia) Robert Farah
← 2010 ·	Levene Gouldin & Thompson Tennis Challenger	· 2012 →

The 2011 Levene Gouldin & Thompson Tennis Challenger was a professional tennis tournament played on hard courts. It was the 18th edition of the tournament which was part of the 2011 ATP Challenger Tour. It took place in Binghamton, New York United States between 8 and 14 August 2011.

== Singles main-draw entrants ==
=== Seeds ===
Country	Player	Rank^{1}	Seed
RSA	Izak van der Merwe	113	1
CHI	Paul Capdeville	118	2
USA	~~Bobby Reynolds~~	122	~~3~~
SVN	Grega Žemlja	130	4
BRA	Rogério Dutra da Silva	132	5
BEL	Ruben Bemelmans	145	6
ESP	Arnau Brugués Davi	155	7
USA	Wayne Odesnik	161	8
JPN	Yūichi Sugita	164	9

- ^{1} Rankings are as of August 1, 2011.

=== Other entrants ===
The following players received wildcards into the singles main draw:

- (United States) Alexander Domijan
- (Chile) Nicolás Massú
- (United States) Tennys Sandgren
- (United States) Rhyne Williams

The following players received entry from the qualifying draw:

- (United States) Adam El Mihdawy
- (Slovenia) Luka Gregorc
- (Bulgaria) Dimitar Kutrovsky
- (Australia) Benjamin Mitchell

The following player received entry as a lucky loser into the singles main draw:

- (Brazil) Bruno Semenzato

== Champions ==
=== Singles ===
(Chile) Paul Capdeville def. (United States) Wayne Odesnik, 7–6^{(7–4)}, 6–3

=== Doubles ===
(Colombia) Juan Sebastián Cabal / (Colombia) Robert Farah def. (Philippines) Treat Conrad Huey / (Denmark) Frederik Nielsen, 6–4, 6–3
