= 2016 Levene Gouldin & Thompson Tennis Challenger – Doubles =

Doubles
- 2016 Levene Gouldin & Thompson Tennis Challenger

Final
- Champions: (Australia) Matt Reid (Australia) John-Patrick Smith
- Runners-up: (United Kingdom) Liam Broady (Brazil) Guilherme Clezar
- Score: 6–4, 6–2

Events
Singles	Doubles
- Levene Gouldin & Thompson Tennis Challenger

Dean O'Brien and Ruan Roelofse were the defending champions but lost in the first round to Quentin Halys and Stefan Kozlov.

Matt Reid and John-Patrick Smith won the title after defeating Liam Broady and Guilherme Clezar 6–4, 6–2 in the final.

== Seeds ==
1. (South Africa) Dean O'Brien / (South Africa) Ruan Roelofse (first round)
2. (Australia) Matt Reid / (Australia) John-Patrick Smith (champions)
3. (Kazakhstan) Andrey Golubev / (India) Jeevan Nedunchezhiyan (first round)
4. (United States) Sekou Bangoura / (Republic of Ireland) David O'Hare (semifinals)

== Draw ==
Key

- Q = Qualifier
- WC = Wild card
- LL = Lucky loser
- Alt = Alternate
- ITF = ITF entry
- PR = Protected ranking
- SR = Special ranking
- SE = Special exempt
- JE = Junior exempt
- JR = Junior Accelerator Programme entrant
- CO = College Accelerator Programme entrant
- NG = Next Gen Accelerator Program entrant
- w/o = Walkover
- r = Retired
- d = Defaulted

First round
1	(South Africa) D O'Brien (South Africa) R Roelofse	5	1
(France) Q Halys (United States) S Kozlov	7	6
Q	(Colombia) Juan Benitez Chavarriaga (United States) Raleigh Smith	7^{7}	3	[5]
(Australia) Jarryd Chaplin (Australia) B Mitchell	6^{0}	6	[10]
3	(Kazakhstan) A Golubev (India) J Nedunchezhiyan	6^{10}	2
(United Kingdom) L Broady (Brazil) G Clezar	7^{12}	6
(United Kingdom) L Glasspool (United Kingdom) B Klein	3	6	[10]
(United States) M Krueger (United States) D Nguyen	6	2	[8]
(Republic of Ireland) S Barry (Japan) Y Uchiyama	6	6^{4}	[5]
WC	(United States) A Lawson (United States) J Withrow	3	7^{7}	[10]
(Italy) Erik Crepaldi (United States) E King	5	2
4	(United States) S Bangoura (Republic of Ireland) D O'Hare	7	6
WC	(United States) William Mendler (United States) Nick Zieziula	1	4
WC	(United States) T-S Kwiatkowski (United States) T Paul	6	6
(United States) N Meister (United States) E Quigley	5	3
2	(Australia) M Reid (Australia) J-P Smith	7	6

Quarterfinals
(France) Q Halys (United States) S Kozlov	6	7^{10}
(Australia) J Chaplin (Australia) B Mitchell	3	6^{8}
(United Kingdom) L Broady (Brazil) G Clezar	6	7
(United Kingdom) L Glasspool (United Kingdom) B Klein	2	5
WC	(United States) A Lawson (United States) J Withrow	6^{5}	6^{3}
4	(United States) S Bangoura (Republic of Ireland) D O'Hare	7^{7}	7^{7}
WC	(United States) T-S Kwiatkowski (United States) T Paul	2	2
2	(Australia) M Reid (Australia) J-P Smith	6	6

Semifinals
(France) Q Halys (United States) S Kozlov
(United Kingdom) L Broady (Brazil) G Clezar	w/o
4	(United States) S Bangoura (Republic of Ireland) D O'Hare	6^{4}	3
2	(Australia) M Reid (Australia) J-P Smith	7^{7}	6

Final
(United Kingdom) L Broady (Brazil) G Clezar	4	2
2	(Australia) M Reid (Australia) J-P Smith	6	6
