= 2009 Levene Gouldin & Thompson Tennis Challenger =

- Date: August 10–16
- Edition: 16th
- Surface: Hard
- Location: Binghamton, New York, United States

Champions

Singles
- (Chile) Paul Capdeville

Doubles
- (South Africa) Rik de Voest / (United States) Scott Lipsky
← 2008 ·	Levene Gouldin & Thompson Tennis Challenger	· 2010 →

The 2009 Levene Gouldin & Thompson Tennis Challenger was a professional tennis tournament played on outdoor hard courts. It was the sixteenth edition of the tournament which was part of the 2009 ATP Challenger Tour. It took place in Binghamton, New York, United States, between 10 and 16 August 2009.

== Singles main-draw entrants ==
=== Seeds ===
Nationality	Player	Ranking*	Seeding
UZB	Denis Istomin	67	1
CHI	Paul Capdeville	85	2
AUS	~~Chris Guccione~~	~~128~~	~~3~~
CYP	~~Marcos Baghdatis~~	~~136~~	~~4~~
AUS	Carsten Ball	145	5
ISR	Harel Levy	149	6
RSA	Kevin Anderson	151	7
IND	Somdev Devvarman	153	8

- Rankings are as of August 3, 2009.

=== Other entrants ===
The following players received wildcards into the singles main draw:

- (India) Prakash Amritraj
- (United States) Lester Cook
- (Philippines) Cecil Mamiit
- (United States) Blake Strode

The following players received a Special Exempt into the main draw:

- (United States) Tim Smyczek

The following players received entry from the qualifying draw:

- (Italy) Luigi D'Agord
- (Lithuania) Laurynas Grigelis (as a Lucky Loser)
- (United States) Ryan Harrison
- (United States) Roy Kalmanovich
- (Armenia) Tigran Martirosyan (as a Lucky Loser)
- (Netherlands) Igor Sijsling

== Champions ==
=== Singles ===
(Chile) Paul Capdeville def. (South Africa) Kevin Anderson, 7–6(7), 7–6(11)

=== Doubles ===
(South Africa) Rik de Voest / (United States) Scott Lipsky def. (Australia) Carsten Ball / (United States) Kaes Van't Hof, 7–6(2), 6–4
