= 2019 Levene Gouldin & Thompson Tennis Challenger – Singles =

Singles
- 2019 Levene Gouldin & Thompson Tennis Challenger

Final
- Champion: (Japan) Yūichi Sugita
- Runner-up: (Brazil) João Menezes
- Score: 7–6^{(7–2)}, 1–6, 6–2

Events
Singles	Doubles
- Levene Gouldin & Thompson Tennis Challenger

Jay Clarke was the defending champion but chose not to defend his title.

Yūichi Sugita won the title after defeating João Menezes 7–6^{(7–2)}, 1–6, 6–2 in the final.

== Seeds ==
All seeds receive a bye into the second round.

1. (Spain) Marcel Granollers (withdrew)
2. (India) Ramkumar Ramanathan (second round)
3. (Ukraine) Sergiy Stakhovsky (second round)
4. (Israel) Dudi Sela (quarterfinals)
5. (United States) Noah Rubin (second round)
6. (Australia) Marc Polmans (second round)
7. (United States) Mitchell Krueger (semifinals)
8. (United States) Thai-Son Kwiatkowski (second round)
9. (Italy) Jannik Sinner (third round)
10. (South Korea) Lee Duck-hee (quarterfinals)
11. (Japan) Yūichi Sugita (champion)
12. (United States) JC Aragone (second round)
13. (Australia) Max Purcell (quarterfinals)
14. (Brazil) João Menezes (final)
15. (Russia) Evgeny Karlovskiy (semifinals)
16. (United States) J. J. Wolf (second round)

== Draw ==
Key

- Q = Qualifier
- WC = Wild card
- LL = Lucky loser
- Alt = Alternate
- ITF = ITF entry
- PR = Protected ranking
- SR = Special ranking
- SE = Special exempt
- JE = Junior exempt
- JR = Junior Accelerator Programme entrant
- CO = College Accelerator Programme entrant
- NG = Next Gen Accelerator Program entrant
- w/o = Walkover
- r = Retired
- d = Defaulted

=== Finals ===
Quarterfinals
13	(Australia) Max Purcell	3	1
11	(Japan) Yūichi Sugita	6	6
4	(Israel) Dudi Sela	6	6^{5}	4
7/WC	(United States) Mitchell Krueger	1	7^{7}	6
10	(South Korea) Lee Duck-hee	5	2
14	(Brazil) João Menezes	7	6
(United States) Maxime Cressy	6^{2}	6	6^{4}
15	(Russia) Evgeny Karlovskiy	7^{7}	4	7^{7}

Semifinals
11	(Japan) Yūichi Sugita	6	4	6
7/WC	(United States) Mitchell Krueger	3	6	4
14	(Brazil) João Menezes	6	6
15	(Russia) Evgeny Karlovskiy	3	3

Final
11	(Japan) Yūichi Sugita	7^{7}	1	6
14	(Brazil) João Menezes	6^{2}	6	2

=== Top half ===
==== Section 1 ====
First round
(United States) R Shane	3	4
(Chile) A Tabilo	6	6
Alt	(Ukraine) V Uzhylovskyi	3	6	2
PR	(United States) R Sarmiento	6	3	6
(Spain) R Ortega Olmedo	6^{5}	3
(United States) S Kozlov	7^{7}	0^{r}
(Israel) E Leshem	6	6
ITF	(Ecuador) D Hidalgo	4	2

Second round
Alt	(United States) JP Fruttero	3	5
(Chile) A Tabilo	6	7
PR	(United States) R Sarmiento	6^{3}	7^{7}	6^{1}
13	(Australia) M Purcell	7^{7}	6^{4}	7^{7}
11	(Japan) Y Sugita	7	6
(Spain) R Ortega Olmedo	5	1
(Israel) E Leshem	6	6
6	(Australia) M Polmans	4	3

Third round
(Chile) A Tabilo	4	4
13	(Australia) M Purcell	6	6
11	(Japan) Y Sugita	6	7^{7}
(Israel) E Leshem	3	6^{4}

Quarterfinals
13	(Australia) M Purcell	3	1
11	(Japan) Y Sugita	6	6

==== Section 2 ====
First round
ITF	(United States) S Kirchheimer	7^{7}	6
(Colombia) A González	6^{5}	3
ITF	(United Kingdom) L Glasspool	1	6^{0}
(United States) C Altamirano	6	7^{7}
ITF	(Russia) A Zakharov	2	2
(Chile) MT Barrios Vera	6	6
(United States) Roy Smith	5	6^{3}
(Spain) C Gómez-Herrera	7	7^{7}

Second round
4	(Israel) D Sela	7	6
ITF	(United States) S Kirchheimer	5	2
(United States) C Altamirano	6	7
16	(United States) J. J. Wolf	2	5
9	(Italy) J Sinner	6	4	6
(Chile) MT Barrios Vera	4	6	4
(Spain) C Gómez-Herrera	4	6	6^{5}
7/WC	(United States) M Krueger	6	3	7^{7}

Third round
4	(Israel) D Sela	6	7
(United States) C Altamirano	4	5
9	(Italy) J Sinner	5	6	3
7/WC	(United States) M Krueger	7	1	6

Quarterfinals
4	(Israel) D Sela	6	6^{5}	4
7/WC	(United States) M Krueger	1	7^{7}	6

=== Bottom half ===
==== Section 3 ====
First round
(Russia) T Gabashvili	6	7
Alt	(United States) K Poling	1	5
Alt	(United States) Nathan Ponwith	2	1
(Australia) A Vukic	6	6
(United States) Ma Redlicki	7^{7}	6^{2}	6^{2}
(Australia) L Saville	6^{5}	7^{7}	7^{7}
(United States) A Rybakov	6^{7}	6	6
Alt	(Portugal) B Saraiva	7^{9}	1	3

Second round
5/WC	(United States) N Rubin	7^{7}	1	4
(Russia) T Gabashvili	6^{5}	6	6
(Australia) A Vukic	3	3
10	(South Korea) D-h Lee	6	6
14	(Brazil) J Menezes	6	6
(Australia) L Saville	4	3
(United States) A Rybakov	7^{10}	4	7^{7}
3/WC	(Ukraine) S Stakhovsky	6^{8}	6	6^{5}

Third round
(Russia) T Gabashvili	4	3
10	(South Korea) D-h Lee	6	6
14	(Brazil) J Menezes	7^{7}	6
(United States) A Rybakov	6^{3}	3

Quarterfinals
10	(South Korea) D-h Lee	5	2
14	(Brazil) J Menezes	7	6

==== Section 4 ====
First round
(United States) S Bangoura	6	7
WC	(United States) A Fenty	3	5
ITF	(United States) Preston Brown	3	4
(United States) M Cressy	6	6
(United States) J McNally	7^{7}	6
Alt	(United States) N Pasha	6^{2}	4
WC	(United States) A Ritschard	3	6	6
ITF	(Greece) M Pervolarakis	6	4	4

Second round
8	(United States) T-S Kwiatkowski	6^{4}	4
(United States) S Bangoura	7^{7}	6
(United States) M Cressy	7^{9}	4	6
12	(United States) JC Aragone	6^{7}	6	3
15	(Russia) E Karlovskiy	6	6^{7}	6
(United States) J McNally	4	7^{9}	1
WC	(United States) A Ritschard	2	7^{7}	6
2	(India) R Ramanathan	6	6^{3}	2

Third round
(United States) S Bangoura	6	2	6^{3}
(United States) M Cressy	4	6	7^{7}
15	(Russia) E Karlovskiy	6	7^{7}
WC	(United States) A Ritschard	4	6^{4}

Quarterfinals
(United States) M Cressy	6^{2}	6	6^{4}
15	(Russia) E Karlovskiy	7^{7}	4	7^{7}
