= 2018 Levene Gouldin & Thompson Tennis Challenger – Doubles =

Doubles
- 2018 Levene Gouldin & Thompson Tennis Challenger

Final
- Champions: (Spain) Gerard Granollers (Spain) Marcel Granollers
- Runners-up: (Colombia) Alejandro Gómez (Brazil) Caio Silva
- Score: 7–6^{(7–2)}, 6–4

Events
| Singles | Doubles |
- Levene Gouldin & Thompson Tennis Challenger

Denis Kudla and Daniel Nguyen were the defending champions but chose not to defend their title.

Gerard Granollers and Marcel Granollers won the title after defeating Alejandro Gómez and Caio Silva 7–6^{(7–2)}, 6–4 in the final.

== Seeds ==
1. (Spain) Gerard Granollers / (Spain) Marcel Granollers (champions)
2. (United States) Robert Galloway / (Venezuela) Roberto Maytín (semifinals)
3. (Mexico) Hans Hach Verdugo / (Sweden) Andreas Siljeström (semifinals)
4. (India) Saketh Myneni / (India) Vijay Sundar Prashanth (first round)

== Draw ==
Key

- Q = Qualifier
- WC = Wild card
- LL = Lucky loser
- Alt = Alternate
- ITF = ITF entry
- PR = Protected ranking
- SR = Special ranking
- SE = Special exempt
- JE = Junior exempt
- JR = Junior Accelerator Programme entrant
- CO = College Accelerator Programme entrant
- NG = Next Gen Accelerator Program entrant
- w/o = Walkover
- r = Retired
- d = Defaulted

First round
1 | (Spain) G Granollers (Spain) M Granollers | 6 | 6
(Australia) A Harris (Australia) L Saville | 4 | 2
Q | (United States) V Kirkov (United States) A Ritschard | 6 | 6
WC | (United States) B Holt (United States) T-S Kwiatkowski | 3 | 4
3 | (Mexico) H Hach Verdugo (Sweden) A Siljeström | 6 | 7^{7}
(Brazil) K Sell (Brazil) Thales Turini | 1 | 6^{3}
(Italy) A Bega (Lithuania) L Grigelis | 3 | 6 | [10]
(Monaco) L Catarina (France) H Grenier | 6 | 2 | [8]
WC | (United States) A Reed (United States) Evan Song | 3 | 5
PR | (Colombia) A Gómez (Brazil) Caio Silva | 6 | 7
WC | (Italy) Ludovico Cestarollo (United States) K Poling | 6^{2} | 7 | [12]
4 | (India) S Myneni (India) VS Prashanth | 7^{7} | 5 | [10]
(United States) H Johnson (United States) Y Johnson | 6^{5} | 7 | [10]
(France) A Escoffier (France) Tom Jomby | 7^{7} | 5 | [7]
(South Africa) L Harris (South Africa) R Roelofse | 3 | 4
2 | (United States) R Galloway (Venezuela) R Maytín | 6 | 6

Quarterfinals
1 | (Spain) G Granollers (Spain) M Granollers | 6 | 7
Q | (United States) V Kirkov (United States) A Ritschard | 2 | 5
3 | (Mexico) H Hach Verdugo (Sweden) A Siljeström | 6 | 6
(Italy) A Bega (Lithuania) L Grigelis | 3 | 4
PR | (Colombia) A Gómez (Brazil) C Silva | 6 | 6
WC | (Italy) L Cestarollo (United States) K Poling | 2 | 4
(United States) H Johnson (United States) Y Johnson | 4 | 4
2 | (United States) R Galloway (Venezuela) R Maytín | 6 | 6

Semifinals
1 | (Spain) G Granollers (Spain) M Granollers | 6^{5} | 7^{7} | [10]
3 | (Mexico) H Hach Verdugo (Sweden) A Siljeström | 7^{7} | 6^{3} | [5]
PR | (Colombia) A Gómez (Brazil) C Silva | 6^{3} | 6 | [10]
2 | (United States) R Galloway (Venezuela) R Maytín | 7^{7} | 4 | [6]

Final
1 | (Spain) G Granollers (Spain) M Granollers | 7^{7} | 6
PR | (Colombia) A Gómez (Brazil) C Silva | 6^{2} | 4
