= 2016 Levene Gouldin & Thompson Tennis Challenger – Singles =

Singles
- 2016 Levene Gouldin & Thompson Tennis Challenger

Final
- Champion: (Barbados) Darian King
- Runner-up: (United States) Mitchell Krueger
- Score: 6–2, 6–3

Events
Singles	Doubles
- Levene Gouldin & Thompson Tennis Challenger

Kyle Edmund was the defending champion but chose not to defend his title.

Darian King won the title after defeating Mitchell Krueger 6–2, 6–3 in the final.

== Seeds ==
1. (France) Quentin Halys (first round)
2. (Japan) Go Soeda (withdrew)
3. (United States) Stefan Kozlov (quarterfinals, retired)
4. (Australia) John-Patrick Smith (second round)
5. (United States) Noah Rubin (first round)
6. (Barbados) Darian King (champion)
7. (Brazil) Guilherme Clezar (first round)
8. (United States) Tommy Paul (first round)
9. (Kazakhstan) Andrey Golubev (semifinals)

== Draw ==
Key

- Q = Qualifier
- WC = Wild card
- LL = Lucky loser
- Alt = Alternate
- ITF = ITF entry
- PR = Protected ranking
- SR = Special ranking
- SE = Special exempt
- JE = Junior exempt
- JR = Junior Accelerator Programme entrant
- CO = College Accelerator Programme entrant
- NG = Next Gen Accelerator Program entrant
- w/o = Walkover
- r = Retired
- d = Defaulted

=== Finals ===
Semifinals
(India) Ramkumar Ramanathan	2	4
(United States) Mitchell Krueger	6	6
6	(Barbados) Darian King	1	6	6
9	(Kazakhstan) Andrey Golubev	6	1	3

Final
(United States) Mitchell Krueger	2	3
6	(Barbados) Darian King	6	6

=== Top half ===
First round
1	(France) Q Halys	3	7^{7}	3
(United Kingdom) B Klein	6	6^{5}	6
(Ecuador) E Gómez	3	4
Q	(Australia) A Vukic	6	6
(Japan) Y Uchiyama	3	4
(India) R Ramanathan	6	6
Q	(New Zealand) J Statham	6^{2}	7	6
7	(Brazil) G Clezar	7^{7}	5	4
4	(Australia) J-P Smith	6^{4}	6	7
(United Kingdom) L Broady	7^{7}	4	5
WC	(United States) Jared Hiltzik	3	3
(United States) M Krueger	6	6
(Japan) H Moriya	6	4
LL	(United States) P Kobelt	0	1^{d}
(United States) S Bangoura	4	6	6
8	(United States) T Paul	6	1	1

Second round
(United Kingdom) B Klein	6^{4}	6	6
Q	(Australia) A Vukic	7^{7}	3	1
(India) R Ramanathan	2	6	7^{7}
Q	(New Zealand) J Statham	6	4	6^{3}
4	(Australia) J-P Smith	5	6^{5}
(United States) M Krueger	7	7^{7}
(Japan) H Moriya	6	6
(United States) S Bangoura	4	4

Quarterfinals
(United Kingdom) B Klein	6^{5}	7^{7}	2
(India) R Ramanathan	7^{7}	6^{3}	6
(United States) M Krueger	6	7^{8}
(Japan) H Moriya	3	6^{6}

Semifinals
(India) R Ramanathan	2	4
(United States) M Krueger	6	6

=== Bottom half ===
First round
6	(Barbados) D King	6	3	6
LL	(New Zealand) F Tearney	4	6	0
(Australia) M Reid	4	3
WC	(United States) T-S Kwiatkowski	6	6
WC	(United States) M Mmoh	2	1
(United States) D Nguyen	6	6
WC	(United States) Dennis Nevolo	6	5	0
3	(United States) S Kozlov	3	7	6
5	(United States) N Rubin	3	2
Alt	(United Kingdom) L Glasspool	6	6
(Australia) B Mitchell	3	6^{3}
(United States) N Meister	6	7^{7}
Q	(Italy) Erik Crepaldi	7^{7}	4	7^{7}
(Republic of Ireland) S Barry	6^{5}	6	6^{3}
Q	(United States) E King	6^{5}	6	2
9	(Kazakhstan) A Golubev	7^{7}	2	6

Second round
6	(Barbados) D King	6	7
WC	(United States) T-S Kwiatkowski	4	5
(United States) D Nguyen	6^{7}	4
3	(United States) S Kozlov	7^{9}	6
Alt	(United Kingdom) L Glasspool	6	7^{9}
(United States) N Meister	3	6^{7}
Q	(Italy) E Crepaldi	2	1
9	(Kazakhstan) A Golubev	6	6

Quarterfinals
6	(Barbados) D King	6	4
3	(United States) S Kozlov	2	1^{r}
Alt	(United Kingdom) L Glasspool	4	6	4
9	(Kazakhstan) A Golubev	6	2	6

Semifinals
6	(Barbados) D King	1	6	6
9	(Kazakhstan) A Golubev	6	1	3
