= 2019 Levene Gouldin & Thompson Tennis Challenger – Doubles =

Doubles
- 2019 Levene Gouldin & Thompson Tennis Challenger

Final
- Champions: (Australia) Max Purcell (Australia) Luke Saville
- Runners-up: (United States) JC Aragone (United States) Alex Lawson
- Score: 6–4, 4–6, [10–5]

Events
| Singles | Doubles |
- Levene Gouldin & Thompson Tennis Challenger

Gerard and Marcel Granollers were the defending champions but chose not to defend their title.

Max Purcell and Luke Saville won the title after defeating JC Aragone and Alex Lawson 6–4, 4–6, [10–5] in the final.

== Seeds ==
1. (Australia) Max Purcell / (Australia) Luke Saville (champions)
2. (United States) JC Aragone / (United States) Alex Lawson (final)
3. (United States) John Paul Fruttero / (Philippines) Ruben Gonzales (quarterfinals)
4. (United States) Nathan Pasha / (United States) Max Schnur (quarterfinals)

== Draw ==
Key

- Q = Qualifier
- WC = Wild card
- LL = Lucky loser
- Alt = Alternate
- ITF = ITF entry
- PR = Protected ranking
- SR = Special ranking
- SE = Special exempt
- JE = Junior exempt
- JR = Junior Accelerator Programme entrant
- CO = College Accelerator Programme entrant
- NG = Next Gen Accelerator Program entrant
- w/o = Walkover
- r = Retired
- d = Defaulted

First round
1 | (Australia) M Purcell (Australia) L Saville | 6 | 6
WC | (Israel) E Leshem (United States) R Sarmiento | 2 | 4
WC | (United States) C Altamirano (United States) A Ritschard | 6 | 1 | [10]
(United States) M Cressy (Portugal) B Saraiva | 3 | 6 | [5]
4 | (United States) N Pasha (United States) M Schnur | 7^{7} | 6
ITF | (United Kingdom) L Glasspool (Greece) M Pervolarakis | 6^{4} | 4
ITF | (Ecuador) D Hidalgo (United States) Ma Redlicki | 7 | 6
WC | (United States) S Kirchheimer (United States) Nathan Ponwith | 5 | 3
(United States) S Bangoura (Russia) T Gabashvili | 6 | 7^{7}
(Chile) MT Barrios Vera (Chile) A Tabilo | 4 | 6^{5}
(Spain) C Gómez-Herrera (Spain) R Ortega Olmedo
3 | (United States) JP Fruttero (Philippines) R Gonzales | w/o
(Colombia) A González (Ukraine) V Uzhylovskyi | 3 | 6 | [3]
(Russia) E Karlovskiy (Australia) A Vukic | 6 | 4 | [10]
(South Korea) D-h Lee (Japan) Y Sugita | 1 | 7 | [7]
2 | (United States) JC Aragone (United States) A Lawson | 6 | 5 | [10]

Quarterfinals
1 | (Australia) M Purcell (Australia) L Saville | 5 | 6 | [10]
WC | (United States) C Altamirano (United States) A Ritschard | 7 | 4 | [8]
4 | (United States) N Pasha (United States) M Schnur | 5 | 7^{9} | [7]
ITF | (Ecuador) D Hidalgo (United States) Ma Redlicki | 7 | 6^{7} | [10]
(United States) S Bangoura (Russia) T Gabashvili | 6 | 6
3 | (United States) JP Fruttero (Philippines) R Gonzales | 4 | 4
(Russia) E Karlovskiy (Australia) A Vukic | 5 | 4
2 | (United States) JC Aragone (United States) A Lawson | 7 | 6

Semifinals
1 | (Australia) M Purcell (Australia) L Saville | 6 | 6
ITF | (Ecuador) D Hidalgo (United States) Ma Redlicki | 4 | 2
(United States) S Bangoura (Russia) T Gabashvili | 6^{3} | 6 | [7]
2 | (United States) JC Aragone (United States) A Lawson | 7^{7} | 3 | [10]

Final
1 | (Australia) M Purcell (Australia) L Saville | 6 | 4 | [10]
2 | (United States) JC Aragone (United States) A Lawson | 4 | 6 | [5]
