= 2016 Wimbledon Championships – Men's singles qualifying =

Men's singles qualifying
- 2016 Wimbledon Championships

Events
Singles	men	women		boys	girls
Doubles	men	women	mixed	boys	girls
WC Singles	men	women	quad
WC Doubles	men	women	quad
Legends	men	women	seniors

Qualification
Singles	men	women
Doubles	men	women
- Wimbledon Championships

Players and pairs who neither have high enough rankings nor receive wild cards may participate in a qualifying tournament held one week before the annual Wimbledon Tennis Championships.

== Seeds ==
1. (Russia) Karen Khachanov (qualifying competition)
2. (Czech Republic) Adam Pavlásek (qualifying competition)
3. (Georgia (country)) Nikoloz Basilashvili (second round)
4. (Japan) Yūichi Sugita (first round)
5. (Russia) Konstantin Kravchuk (first round)
6. (United States) Bjorn Fratangelo (qualified)
7. (Slovakia) Andrej Martin (first round)
8. (Italy) Thomas Fabbiano (qualifying competition)
9. (Netherlands) Igor Sijsling (qualified)
10. (Germany) Michael Berrer (second round)
11. (Slovakia) Lukáš Lacko (qualified)
12. (Japan) Yoshihito Nishioka (qualified)
13. (Austria) Gerald Melzer (qualifying competition)
14. (United States) Tim Smyczek (second round)
15. (Moldova) Radu Albot (qualified)
16. (Netherlands) Thiemo de Bakker (first round)
17. (Spain) Daniel Muñoz de la Nava (second round)
18. (Brazil) Thiago Monteiro (first round)
19. (Slovakia) Jozef Kovalík (qualifying competition)
20. (Bosnia and Herzegovina) Mirza Bašić (first round)
21. (Germany) Daniel Brands (qualifying competition)
22. (United States) Austin Krajicek (qualifying competition)
23. (Germany) Tobias Kamke (qualifying competition)
24. (Switzerland) Marco Chiudinelli (first round)
25. (France) Kenny de Schepper (second round)
26. (Argentina) Máximo González (first round)
27. (Argentina) Guido Andreozzi (first round)
28. (United States) Dennis Novikov (qualified)
29. (France) Quentin Halys (qualifying competition)
30. (India) Saketh Myneni (first round)
31. (France) Vincent Millot (second round)
32. (Argentina) Marco Trungelliti (first round)

== Qualifiers ==
1. (Australia) Matthew Barton
2. (Russia) Alexander Kudryavtsev
3. (France) Tristan Lamasine
4. (United Kingdom) Marcus Willis
5. (Belgium) Ruben Bemelmans
6. (United States) Bjorn Fratangelo
7. (Australia) Luke Saville
8. (Romania) Marius Copil
9. (Netherlands) Igor Sijsling
10. (France) Albano Olivetti
11. (Slovakia) Lukáš Lacko
12. (Japan) Yoshihito Nishioka
13. (Croatia) Franko Škugor
14. (United States) Dennis Novikov
15. (Moldova) Radu Albot
16. (France) Édouard Roger-Vasselin

== Qualifying draw ==
=== First qualifier ===
First round
1	(Russia) Karen Khachanov	6	6
(China) Bai Yan	3	4
(Spain) David Pérez Sanz	6^{4}	4
(Spain) Enrique López Pérez	7^{7}	6
(France) Constant Lestienne	4	6^{3}
(El Salvador) Marcelo Arévalo	6	7^{7}
(Australia) Matthew Barton	6^{0}	6	8
32	(Argentina) Marco Trungelliti	7^{7}	4	6

Second round
1	(Russia) Karen Khachanov	6^{4}	6	9
(Spain) Enrique López Pérez	7^{7}	4	7
(El Salvador) Marcelo Arévalo	3	4
(Australia) Matthew Barton	6	6

Qualifying competition
1	(Russia) Karen Khachanov	6^{1}	7^{7}	2	3
(Australia) Matthew Barton	7^{7}	6^{1}	6	6

=== Second qualifier ===
First round
2	(Czech Republic) Adam Pavlásek	7	7
(Switzerland) Henri Laaksonen	5	5
(Barbados) Darian King	1	6	10
(Chinese Taipei) Chen Ti	6	4	8
(United States) Daniel Nguyen	6	6
(Hungary) Márton Fucsovics	3	3
(Russia) Alexander Kudryavtsev	7	3	6
24	(Switzerland) Marco Chiudinelli	5	6	3

Second round
2	(Czech Republic) Adam Pavlásek	6	6
(Barbados) Darian King	3	3
(United States) Daniel Nguyen	4	3
(Russia) Alexander Kudryavtsev	6	6

Qualifying competition
2	(Czech Republic) Adam Pavlásek	3	2	1
(Russia) Alexander Kudryavtsev	6	6	6

=== Third qualifier ===
First round
3	(Georgia (country)) Nikoloz Basilashvili	6	6
(Ukraine) Denys Molchanov	2	1
(Egypt) Mohamed Safwat	6	6
(Argentina) Tomás Lipovšek Puches	3	2
(Slovenia) Grega Žemlja	6	6^{0}	6
(Italy) Luca Vanni	3	7^{7}	3
(France) Tristan Lamasine	4	7^{7}	6
30	(India) Saketh Myneni	6	6^{2}	1

Second round
3	(Georgia (country)) Nikoloz Basilashvili	5	6	5
(Egypt) Mohamed Safwat	7	3	7
(Slovenia) Grega Žemlja	6^{5}	3
(France) Tristan Lamasine	7^{7}	6

Qualifying competition
(Egypt) Mohamed Safwat	3	5	5
(France) Tristan Lamasine	6	7	7

=== Fourth qualifier ===
First round
4	(Japan) Yūichi Sugita	6	4	1
WC	(United Kingdom) Marcus Willis	1	6	6
(United States) Alexander Sarkissian	1	4
(Russia) Andrey Rublev	6	6
(Russia) Daniil Medvedev	6	6
(United States) Stefan Kozlov	2	2
(Germany) Peter Gojowczyk	4	6	1
31	(France) Vincent Millot	6	3	6

Second round
WC	(United Kingdom) Marcus Willis	7	6
(Russia) Andrey Rublev	5	4
(Russia) Daniil Medvedev	6	6
31	(France) Vincent Millot	4	2

Qualifying competition
WC	(United Kingdom) Marcus Willis	3	7	6	6
(Russia) Daniil Medvedev	6	5	3	4

=== Fifth qualifier ===
First round
5	(Russia) Konstantin Kravchuk	3	6^{5}
(Spain) Adrián Menéndez Maceiras	6	7^{7}
(Belgium) Ruben Bemelmans	6	6
(Israel) Amir Weintraub	3	2
(India) Ramkumar Ramanathan	7	6^{2}	6
(Czech Republic) Marek Michalička	5	7^{7}	4
(Germany) Mischa Zverev	4	6^{3}
21	(Germany) Daniel Brands	6	7^{7}

Second round
(Spain) Adrián Menéndez Maceiras	6	3	9
(Belgium) Ruben Bemelmans	4	6	11
(India) Ramkumar Ramanathan	6^{5}	6^{3}
21	(Germany) Daniel Brands	7^{7}	7^{7}

Qualifying competition
(Belgium) Ruben Bemelmans	6	6	6^{2}	4	6
21	(Germany) Daniel Brands	1	4	7^{7}	6	3

=== Sixth qualifier ===
First round
6	(United States) Bjorn Fratangelo	6	7
(United States) Ryan Harrison	4	5
(France) Axel Michon	7^{7}	6
(Estonia) Jürgen Zopp	6^{5}	4
WC	(United Kingdom) Joe Salisbury	4	7^{7}	6
(Italy) Alessandro Giannessi	6	6^{3}	3
(Australia) John-Patrick Smith	2	6	9
22	(United States) Austin Krajicek	6	3	11

Second round
6	(United States) Bjorn Fratangelo	6^{9}	6	6
(France) Axel Michon	7^{11}	1	2
WC	(United Kingdom) Joe Salisbury	4	6	3
22	(United States) Austin Krajicek	6	3	6

Qualifying competition
6	(United States) Bjorn Fratangelo	6	6	5	6
22	(United States) Austin Krajicek	3	1	7	3

=== Seventh qualifier ===
First round
7	(Slovakia) Andrej Martin	6^{0}	5
(Spain) Pere Riba	7^{7}	7
(Ukraine) Artem Smirnov	3	1
PR	(Germany) Matthias Bachinger	6	6
(Australia) Luke Saville	6	4	6
(Spain) Oriol Roca Batalla	1	6	4
(Bosnia and Herzegovina) Aldin Šetkić	6	6
26	(Argentina) Máximo González	2	3

Second round
(Spain) Pere Riba	4	5
PR	(Germany) Matthias Bachinger	6	7
(Australia) Luke Saville	6	3	8
(Bosnia and Herzegovina) Aldin Šetkić	4	6	6

Qualifying competition
PR	(Germany) Matthias Bachinger	4	6	6	6^{1}	4
(Australia) Luke Saville	6	3	2	7^{7}	6

=== Eighth qualifier ===
First round
8	(Italy) Thomas Fabbiano	6	4	6
PR	(Slovenia) Blaž Kavčič	1	6	4
(Spain) Rubén Ramírez Hidalgo	6^{1}	6	6
(Romania) Adrian Ungur	7^{7}	4	3
(Romania) Marius Copil	6	6
(China) Wu Di	1	2
(Australia) James Duckworth	1	7^{7}	3
25	(France) Kenny de Schepper	6	6^{5}	6

Second round
8	(Italy) Thomas Fabbiano	6	6
(Spain) Rubén Ramírez Hidalgo	4	2
(Romania) Marius Copil	7	6
25	(France) Kenny de Schepper	5	4

Qualifying competition
8	(Italy) Thomas Fabbiano	5	5	4
(Romania) Marius Copil	7	7	6

=== Ninth qualifier ===
First round
9	(Netherlands) Igor Sijsling	6	6
(Germany) Nils Langer	2	4
WC	(United Kingdom) Daniel Smethurst	3	6^{6}
(France) Calvin Hemery	6	7^{8}
(Argentina) Nicolás Kicker	1	3
(Czech Republic) Jan Šátral	6	6
(Belgium) Yannick Mertens	6	6
27	(Argentina) Guido Andreozzi	3	4

Second round
9	(Netherlands) Igor Sijsling	6	6
(France) Calvin Hemery	1	3
(Czech Republic) Jan Šátral	4	6^{0}
(Belgium) Yannick Mertens	6	7^{7}

Qualifying competition
9	(Netherlands) Igor Sijsling	6	6	7^{7}
(Belgium) Yannick Mertens	3	2	6^{2}

=== Tenth qualifier ===
First round
10	(Germany) Michael Berrer	6	2	6
PR	(Germany) Cedrik-Marcel Stebe	4	6	4
WC	(United Kingdom) Edward Corrie	6	1	7
(United States) Tommy Paul	3	6	5
(Brazil) André Ghem	6^{2}	4
PR	(France) Albano Olivetti	7^{7}	6
(France) Grégoire Barrère	6	6
20	(Bosnia and Herzegovina) Mirza Bašić	3	4

Second round
10	(Germany) Michael Berrer	0	3
WC	(United Kingdom) Edward Corrie	6	6
PR	(France) Albano Olivetti	6^{6}	7	8
(France) Grégoire Barrère	7^{8}	5	6

Qualifying competition
WC	(United Kingdom) Edward Corrie	6^{5}	6^{4}	6^{3}
PR	(France) Albano Olivetti	7^{7}	7^{7}	7^{7}

=== Eleventh qualifier ===
First round
11	(Slovakia) Lukáš Lacko	6	6
(Kazakhstan) Aleksandr Nedovyesov	4	2
(France) Alexandre Sidorenko	7^{8}	3	6
(Italy) Federico Gaio	6^{6}	6	3
(Spain) Jordi Samper Montaña	4	5
(France) Mathias Bourgue	6	7
(Serbia) Marko Tepavac	6^{3}	2
23	(Germany) Tobias Kamke	7^{7}	6

Second round
11	(Slovakia) Lukáš Lacko	6	6
(France) Alexandre Sidorenko	2	3
(France) Mathias Bourgue	4	4
23	(Germany) Tobias Kamke	6	6

Qualifying competition
11	(Slovakia) Lukáš Lacko	6	6^{9}	6	6
23	(Germany) Tobias Kamke	2	7^{11}	2	2

=== Twelfth qualifier ===
First round
12	(Japan) Yoshihito Nishioka	6	6
(Kazakhstan) Andrey Golubev	0	4
(Slovakia) Norbert Gombos	6^{4}	7^{7}	2
(Portugal) Frederico Ferreira Silva	7^{7}	6^{3}	6
(Kazakhstan) Dmitry Popko	2	5
(China) Li Zhe	6	7
(Chile) Hans Podlipnik Castillo	0	1
29	(France) Quentin Halys	6	6

Second round
12	(Japan) Yoshihito Nishioka	7	6
(Portugal) Frederico Ferreira Silva	5	4
(China) Li Zhe	6^{5}	4
29	(France) Quentin Halys	7^{7}	6

Qualifying competition
12	(Japan) Yoshihito Nishioka	7^{7}	4	6	6
29	(France) Quentin Halys	6^{1}	6	2	3

=== Thirteenth qualifier ===
First round
13	(Austria) Gerald Melzer	5	6	6
(Canada) Steven Diez	7	3	3
(Italy) Andrea Arnaboldi	4	7^{7}	3
(Japan) Go Soeda	6	6^{2}	6
(Croatia) Franko Škugor	6	6
(Serbia) Peđa Krstin	2	4
(Turkey) Marsel İlhan	3	4
17	(Spain) Daniel Muñoz de la Nava	6	6

Second round
13	(Austria) Gerald Melzer	2	6	6
(Japan) Go Soeda	6	2	3
(Croatia) Franko Škugor	7^{7}	6
17	(Spain) Daniel Muñoz de la Nava	6^{4}	2

Qualifying competition
13	(Austria) Gerald Melzer	6	1	4	4
(Croatia) Franko Škugor	4	6	6	6

=== Fourteenth qualifier ===
First round
14	(United States) Tim Smyczek	7^{7}	6
(Belarus) Ilya Ivashka	6^{3}	2
(Uzbekistan) Farrukh Dustov	2	3
(Japan) Hiroki Moriya	6	6
(Belarus) Uladzimir Ignatik	6	3	6
(Argentina) Renzo Olivo	4	6	2
WC	(United Kingdom) Lloyd Glasspool	2	5
28	(United States) Dennis Novikov	6	7

Second round
14	(United States) Tim Smyczek	1	6	4
(Japan) Hiroki Moriya	6	3	6
(Belarus) Uladzimir Ignatik	6	6^{3}	8
28	(United States) Dennis Novikov	2	7^{7}	10

Qualifying competition
(Japan) Hiroki Moriya	6	2	3	2
28	(United States) Dennis Novikov	2	6	6	6

=== Fifteenth qualifier ===
First round
15	(Moldova) Radu Albot	6	6
(Brazil) Guilherme Clezar	3	3
(France) David Guez	6	7
(United States) Frances Tiafoe	3	5
(Colombia) Alejandro Falla	7^{9}	6
(Italy) Salvatore Caruso	6^{7}	1
(Argentina) Facundo Argüello	3	2
19	(Slovakia) Jozef Kovalík	6	6

Second round
15	(Moldova) Radu Albot	6	7^{7}
(France) David Guez	4	6^{2}
(Colombia) Alejandro Falla	3	7^{7}	11
19	(Slovakia) Jozef Kovalík	6	6^{5}	13

Qualifying competition
15	(Moldova) Radu Albot	4	7^{7}	6	6
19	(Slovakia) Jozef Kovalík	6	6^{0}	1	3

=== Sixteenth qualifier ===
First round
16	(Netherlands) Thiemo de Bakker	1	2
WC	(United Kingdom) Daniel Cox	6	6
(Austria) Dennis Novak	6	6
(China) Zhang Ze	4	2
(Colombia) Eduardo Struvay	4	3
(France) Édouard Roger-Vasselin	6	6
PR	(Germany) Julian Reister	6	6
18	(Brazil) Thiago Monteiro	0	4

Second round
WC	(United Kingdom) Daniel Cox	3	5
(Austria) Dennis Novak	6	7
(France) Édouard Roger-Vasselin	6	7^{7}
PR	(Germany) Julian Reister	1	6^{3}

Qualifying competition
(Austria) Dennis Novak	6	5	6^{5}	4
(France) Édouard Roger-Vasselin	2	7	7^{7}	6
