= 2018 Levene Gouldin & Thompson Tennis Challenger =

- Date: 23–29 July
- Edition: 25th
- Surface: Hard court
- Location: Binghamton, United States

Champions

Singles
- (United Kingdom) Jay Clarke

Doubles
- (Spain) Gerard Granollers / (Spain) Marcel Granollers
← 2017 ·	Levene Gouldin & Thompson Tennis Challenger	· 2019 →

The 2018 Levene Gouldin & Thompson Tennis Challenger was a professional tennis tournament played on hard court. It was the 25th edition of the tournament which was part of the 2018 ATP Challenger Tour. It took place in Binghamton, United States between 23 and 29 July 2018.

== Singles main-draw entrants ==
=== Seeds ===
Country	Player	Rank^{1}	Seed
AUS	Jordan Thompson	101	1
ESP	Marcel Granollers	124	2
USA	Bjorn Fratangelo	133	3
USA	Bradley Klahn	143	4
BAR	Darian King	179	5
USA	Christian Harrison	208	6
RSA	Lloyd Harris	217	7
GBR	Jay Clarke	225	8
GER	Dominik Köpfer	231	9

- ^{1} Rankings are as of July 16, 2018.

=== Other entrants ===
The following players received wildcards into the singles main draw:

- (United States) Alafia Ayeni
- (United States) William Blumberg
- (United States) Martin Redlicki
- (United States) Alex Rybakov

The following player received entry into the singles main draw using a protected ranking:

- (Colombia) Alejandro Gómez

The following player received entry into the singles main draw as a special exempt:

- (United States) Bradley Klahn

The following players received entry from the qualifying draw:

- (Australia) Andrew Harris
- (United States) Jared Hiltzik
- (United States) Alexander Ritschard
- (Denmark) Mikael Torpegaard

The following player received entry as a lucky loser:

- (France) Antoine Escoffier

== Champions ==
=== Singles ===
- (United Kingdom) Jay Clarke def. (Australia) Jordan Thompson 6–7^{(6–8)}, 7–6^{(7–5)}, 6–4

=== Doubles ===
- (Spain) Gerard Granollers / (Spain) Marcel Granollers def. (Colombia) Alejandro Gómez / (Brazil) Caio Silva 7–6^{(7–2)}, 6–4.
