= 2018 Levene Gouldin & Thompson Tennis Challenger – Singles =

Singles
- 2018 Levene Gouldin & Thompson Tennis Challenger

Final
- Champion: (United Kingdom) Jay Clarke
- Runner-up: (Australia) Jordan Thompson
- Score: 6–7^{(6–8)}, 7–6^{(7–5)}, 6–4

Events
Singles	Doubles
- Levene Gouldin & Thompson Tennis Challenger

Cameron Norrie was the defending champion but chose not to defend his title.

Jay Clarke won the title after defeating Jordan Thompson 6–7^{(6–8)}, 7–6^{(7–5)}, 6–4 in the final.

== Seeds ==
1. (Australia) Jordan Thompson (final)
2. (Spain) Marcel Granollers (semifinals)
3. (United States) Bjorn Fratangelo (first round)
4. (United States) Bradley Klahn (first round)
5. (Barbados) Darian King (quarterfinals)
6. (United States) Christian Harrison (withdrew)
7. (South Africa) Lloyd Harris (quarterfinals)
8. (United Kingdom) Jay Clarke (champion)
9. (Germany) Dominik Köpfer (quarterfinals)

== Draw ==
Key

- Q = Qualifier
- WC = Wild card
- LL = Lucky loser
- Alt = Alternate
- ITF = ITF entry
- PR = Protected ranking
- SR = Special ranking
- SE = Special exempt
- JE = Junior exempt
- JR = Junior Accelerator Programme entrant
- CO = College Accelerator Programme entrant
- NG = Next Gen Accelerator Program entrant
- w/o = Walkover
- r = Retired
- d = Defaulted

=== Finals ===
Semifinals
1	(Australia) Jordan Thompson	6	6
(Lithuania) Laurynas Grigelis	4	3
8	(United Kingdom) Jay Clarke	6	6
2	(Spain) Marcel Granollers	4	3

Final
1	(Australia) Jordan Thompson	7^{8}	6^{5}	4
8	(United Kingdom) Jay Clarke	6^{6}	7^{7}	6

=== Top half ===
First round
1	(Australia) J Thompson	7	6
(United Kingdom) J Ward	5	2
(Chile) MT Barrios Vera	3	6	6
(India) S Myneni	6	3	4
(Israel) E Leshem	6	6
WC	(United States) A Rybakov	4	3
Q	(United States) Jared Hiltzik	3	5
9	(Germany) D Köpfer	6	7
3	(United States) B Fratangelo	6	2	3
(Lithuania) L Grigelis	4	6	6
PR	(Colombia) A Gómez	6	6
LL	(France) A Escoffier	2	4
(United Kingdom) A Ward	2	6^{4}
(United Kingdom) D Evans	6	7^{7}
(France) H Grenier	6	3	4
5	(Barbados) D King	3	6	6

Second round
1	(Australia) J Thompson	6	6
(Chile) MT Barrios Vera	1	3
(Israel) E Leshem	4	6	2^{r}
9	(Germany) D Köpfer	6	4	3
(Lithuania) L Grigelis	6	3	6
PR	(Colombia) A Gómez	2	6	4
(United Kingdom) D Evans	3	6^{3}
5	(Barbados) D King	6	7^{7}

Quarterfinals
1	(Australia) J Thompson	6	6
9	(Germany) D Köpfer	4	1
(Lithuania) L Grigelis	4	6	7^{7}
5	(Barbados) D King	6	2	6^{4}

Semifinals
1	(Australia) J Thompson	6	6
(Lithuania) L Grigelis	4	3

=== Bottom half ===
First round
8	(United Kingdom) J Clarke	6	7^{7}
(South Korea) Y-s Chung	1	6^{4}
(United States) M Giron	4	6	7
WC	(United States) Ma Redlicki	6	3	5
(Russia) E Karlovskiy	6	6
Q	(United States) A Ritschard	2	4
Q	(Denmark) M Torpegaard	7^{7}	7^{7}
4/SE	(United States) B Klahn	6^{4}	6^{3}
7	(South Africa) L Harris	6	6
Q	(Australia) A Harris	3	3
WC	(United States) A Ayeni	6	0
(Netherlands) I Sijsling	3	0^{r}
WC	(United States) W Blumberg	4	6	4
(Monaco) L Catarina	6	2	6
(Italy) A Bega	5	4
2	(Spain) M Granollers	7	6

Second round
8	(United Kingdom) J Clarke	3	6	6
(United States) M Giron	6	3	2
(Russia) E Karlovskiy	6	6
Q	(Denmark) M Torpegaard	2	4
7	(South Africa) L Harris	6	6
WC	(United States) A Ayeni	3	3
(Monaco) L Catarina	2	4
2	(Spain) M Granollers	6	6

Quarterfinals
8	(United Kingdom) J Clarke	1	6	6
(Russia) E Karlovskiy	6	2	4
7	(South Africa) L Harris	1	2
2	(Spain) M Granollers	6	6

Semifinals
8	(United Kingdom) J Clarke	6	6
2	(Spain) M Granollers	4	3
