= 2010 Levene Gouldin & Thompson Tennis Challenger – Doubles =

Doubles
- 2010 Levene Gouldin & Thompson Tennis Challenger

Final
- Champions: (Philippines) Treat Conrad Huey; (United Kingdom) Dominic Inglot
- Runners-up: (United States) Scott Lipsky; (United States) David Martin
- Score: 5–7, 7–6(2), [10–8]

Events
Singles	Doubles
- Levene Gouldin & Thompson Tennis Challenger

Rik de Voest and Scott Lipsky were the defending champions, but de Voest chose to not participate this year.
Lipsky partnered with David Martin, but they lost to Treat Conrad Huey and Dominic Inglot in the final 5–7, 7–6(2), [10–8].

== Seeds ==
1. (United Kingdom) Colin Fleming / (United Kingdom) Ken Skupski (semifinals)
2. (Australia) Carsten Ball / (Australia) Chris Guccione (semifinals, withdrew)
3. (United States) Scott Lipsky / (United States) David Martin (final)
4. (Australia) Adam Hubble / (India) Harsh Mankad (quarterfinals)

== Draw ==
Key

- Q = Qualifier
- WC = Wild card
- LL = Lucky loser
- Alt = Alternate
- ITF = ITF entry
- PR = Protected ranking
- SR = Special ranking
- SE = Special exempt
- JE = Junior exempt
- JR = Junior Accelerator Programme entrant
- CO = College Accelerator Programme entrant
- NG = Next Gen Accelerator Program entrant
- w/o = Walkover
- r = Retired
- d = Defaulted

=== Draw ===
First round

Quarterfinals

Semifinals

Finals

1
- (United Kingdom) C Fleming
- (United Kingdom) K Skupski
2
6
[10]

- (United States) R DeHeart
- (United States) JP Fruttero
6
3
[4]

1
- (United Kingdom) C Fleming
- (United Kingdom) K Skupski
6^{6}
6
[11]

- (United States) R Ram
- (United States) B Reynolds
6
6

- (United States) R Ram
- (United States) B Reynolds
7
4
[9]

WC
- (United States) B Joelson
- (United States) C Pollock
2
3

1
- (United Kingdom) C Fleming
- (United Kingdom) K Skupski
6^{4}
6^{5}

4
- (Australia) A Hubble
- (India) H Mankad
4
6
[10]

- (Philippines) TC Huey
- (United Kingdom) D Inglot
7
7

- (United Kingdom) R Bloomfield
- (United States) C Schwartz
6
3
[7]

4
- (Australia) A Hubble
- (India) H Mankad
4
6^{6}

- (Philippines) TC Huey
- (United Kingdom) D Inglot
6
4
[10]

- (Philippines) TC Huey
- (United Kingdom) D Inglot
6
7

- (Japan) K Nishikori
- (Japan) G Soeda
3
6
[3]

- (Philippines) TC Huey
- (United Kingdom) D Inglot
5
7
[10]

WC
- (United States) L Cook
- (United States) C Parr

3
- (United States) S Lipsky
- (United States) D Martin
7
6^{2}
[8]

- (United States) K Kim
- (South Korea) Y-j Kim
w/o

WC
- (United States) L Cook
- (United States) C Parr
4
6
[6]

- (Australia) M Ebden
- (Australia) M Matosevic
2
4

3
- (United States) S Lipsky
- (United States) D Martin
6
3
[10]

3
- (United States) S Lipsky
- (United States) D Martin
6
6

3
- (United States) S Lipsky
- (United States) D Martin

WC
- (United States) A Collarini
- (United States) B Klahn
4
6^{3}

2
- (Australia) C Ball
- (Australia) C Guccione
w/o

- (Australia) A Feeney
- (Australia) G Jones
6
7

- (Australia) A Feeney
- (Australia) G Jones
7
4
[6]

Q
- (Australia) D Kelly
- (Australia) M Reid
1
5

2
- (Australia) C Ball
- (Australia) C Guccione
6^{7}
6
[10]

2
- (Australia) C Ball
- (Australia) C Guccione
6
7
