= 2016 Levene Gouldin & Thompson Tennis Challenger =

- Date: 18 – 24 July
- Edition: 23rd
- Surface: Hard court
- Location: Binghamton, United States

Champions

Singles
- (Barbados) Darian King

Doubles
- (Australia) Matt Reid / (Australia) John-Patrick Smith
- Levene Gouldin & Thompson Tennis Challenger

The 2016 Levene Gouldin & Thompson Tennis Challenger was a professional tennis tournament played on hard court. It was the 23rd edition of the tournament which was part of the 2016 ATP Challenger Tour. It took place in Binghamton, United States between 18 and 24 July 2016.

== Singles main-draw entrants ==
=== Seeds ===
Country	Player	Rank^{1}	Seed
FRA	Quentin Halys	137	1
~~JPN~~	~~Go Soeda~~	~~149~~	~~2~~
USA	Stefan Kozlov	159	3
AUS	John-Patrick Smith	173	4
USA	Noah Rubin	181	5
BAR	Darian King	197	6
BRA	Guilherme Clezar	198	7
USA	Tommy Paul	203	8
KAZ	Andrey Golubev	211	9

- ^{1} Rankings are as of July 11, 2016.

=== Other entrants ===
The following players received wildcards into the singles main draw:

- (United States) Jared Hiltzik
- (United States) Thai-Son Kwiatkowski
- (United States) Michael Mmoh
- (United States) Dennis Nevolo

The following player received entry as an alternate:

- (United Kingdom) Lloyd Glasspool

The following players received entry from the qualifying draw:

- (Australia) Aleksandar Vukic
- (New Zealand) Jose Statham
- (Italy) Erik Crepaldi
- (United States) Evan King

The following players received entry as lucky losers:

- (United States) Peter Kobelt
- (New Zealand) Finn Tearney

== Doubles main-draw entrants ==
=== Seeds ===
Country	Player	Country	Player	Rank^{1}	Seed
RSA	Dean O'Brien	RSA	Ruan Roelofse	257	1
AUS	Matt Reid	AUS	John-Patrick Smith	281	2
KAZ	Andrey Golubev	IND	Jeevan Nedunchezhiyan	314	3
USA	Sekou Bangoura	IRL	David O'Hare	331	4

- ^{1} Rankings are as of July 11, 2016.

=== Other entrants ===
The following pairs received entry as wildcards:

- (United States) Alex Lawson / (United States) Jackson Withrow
- (United States) William Mendler / (United States) Nick Zieziula
- (United States) Thai-Son Kwiatkowski / (United States) Tommy Paul

The following pair received entry as qualifiers into the doubles main draw:

- (Colombia) Juan Manuel Benítez Chavarriaga / (United States) Raleigh Smith

== Champions ==
=== Men's singles ===
- (Barbados) Darian King def. (United States) Mitchell Krueger, 6–2, 6–3

=== Men's doubles ===
- (Australia) Matt Reid / (Australia) John-Patrick Smith def. (United Kingdom) Liam Broady / (Brazil) Guilherme Clezar, 6–4, 6–2
