= 2010 Levene Gouldin & Thompson Tennis Challenger – Singles =

Singles
- 2010 Levene Gouldin & Thompson Tennis Challenger

Final
- Champion: (Japan) Kei Nishikori
- Runner-up: (United States) Robert Kendrick
- Score: 6–3, 7–6(4)

Events
Singles	Doubles
- Levene Gouldin & Thompson Tennis Challenger

The Chilean player Paul Capdeville was the defending champion. However, he was eliminated by Benjamin Balleret in the first round.

Kei Nishikori, who received a wildcard into the singles main draw, won this tournament. He defeated Kevin Kim, Benjamin Balleret, Brian Dabul, Alex Bogomolov Jr. and Robert Kendrick 6–3, 7–6(4) in the final.

== Seeds ==
1. (Argentina) Brian Dabul (quarterfinals)
2. (Japan) Go Soeda (quarterfinals)
3. (Lithuania) Ričardas Berankis (first round)
4. (Australia) Carsten Ball (first round)
5. (United States) Kevin Kim (first round)
6. (United States) Rajeev Ram (first round)
7. (United States) ~~Jesse Levine~~ (withdrew due to a hamstring strain)
8. (United States) Robert Kendrick (final)

== Draw ==
Key

- Q = Qualifier
- WC = Wild card
- LL = Lucky loser
- Alt = Alternate
- ITF = ITF entry
- PR = Protected ranking
- SR = Special ranking
- SE = Special exempt
- JE = Junior exempt
- JR = Junior Accelerator Programme entrant
- CO = College Accelerator Programme entrant
- NG = Next Gen Accelerator Program entrant
- w/o = Walkover
- r = Retired
- d = Defaulted

=== Finals ===
Semifinals
WC	(Japan) Kei Nishikori	7	6
Q	(United States) Alex Bogomolov Jr.	6^{4}	1
Q	(Australia) Chris Guccione	w/o
8	(United States) Robert Kendrick

Final
WC	(Japan) Kei Nishikori	6	7
8	(United States) Robert Kendrick	3	6^{4}

=== Top half ===
First round
1	(Argentina) B Dabul	6	6
(United Kingdom) J Ward	3	4
(Australia) N Lindahl	7	3	4
Q	(Canada) C Klingemann	5	6	6
(Chile) P Capdeville	1	2
(Monaco) B Balleret	6	6
WC	(Japan) K Nishikori	7	3	6
5	(United States) K Kim	6^{4}	6	2
3	(Lithuania) R Berankis	4	4
(United States) J Witten	6	6
LL	(South Korea) D Yoo	1	1
(Australia) M Matosevic	6	6
(United States) R Harrison	7	6
(Australia) G Jones	6^{5}	4
Q	(United States) A Bogomolov Jr.	6	3	6
LL	(Australia) D Kelly	4	6	3

Second round
1	(Argentina) B Dabul	6	6
Q	(Canada) C Klingemann	2	1
(Monaco) B Balleret	3	4
WC	(Japan) K Nishikori	6	6
(United States) J Witten	6	5	7
(Australia) M Matosevic	2	7	5
(United States) R Harrison	3	7	2
Q	(United States) A Bogomolov Jr.	6	6^{3}	6

Quarterfinals
1	(Argentina) B Dabul	6^{5}	2
WC	(Japan) K Nishikori	7	6
(United States) J Witten	6	4	3
Q	(United States) A Bogomolov Jr.	1	6	6

Semifinals
WC	(Japan) K Nishikori	7	6
Q	(United States) A Bogomolov Jr.	6^{4}	1

=== Bottom half ===
First round
6	(United States) R Ram	6	6
LL	(Australia) B Klein	4	2
(Australia) J Millman	7	5	3
Q	(Australia) C Guccione	6^{5}	7	6
(South Korea) Y-j Kim	6	r
WC	(United States) A El Mihdawy	6
WC	(United States) B Klahn	7	6^{4}	6
4	(Australia) C Ball	5	7	4
8	(United States) R Kendrick	6	6
Q	(Australia) A Feeney	1	4
(United States) L Cook	6	6
(United States) B Reynolds	4	3
(Australia) M Ebden	7	6
(United States) A Kuznetsov	6^{4}	4
(United States) R DeHeart	4	6	6^{2}
2	(Japan) G Soeda	6	2	7

Second round
6	(United States) R Ram	3	6^{4}
Q	(Australia) C Guccione	6	7
WC	(United States) A El Mihdawy	4	5
WC	(United States) B Klahn	6	7
8	(United States) R Kendrick	6	6
(United States) L Cook	3	4
(Australia) M Ebden	3	6	1
2	(Japan) G Soeda	6	4	6

Quarterfinals
Q	(Australia) C Guccione	6	6
WC	(United States) B Klahn	4	2
8	(United States) R Kendrick	6	6
2	(Japan) G Soeda	1	4

Semifinals
Q	(Australia) C Guccione	w/o
8	(United States) R Kendrick
