= 2019 Levene Gouldin & Thompson Tennis Challenger =

Professional tennis tournament

- Date: 22–28 July
- Edition: 26th
- Surface: Hard court
- Location: Binghamton, United States

Champions

Singles
- (Japan) Yūichi Sugita

Doubles
- (Australia) Max Purcell / (Australia) Luke Saville
- Levene Gouldin & Thompson Tennis Challenger

The 2019 Levene Gouldin & Thompson Tennis Challenger was a professional tennis tournament played on hard court. It was the 26th edition of the tournament which was part of the 2019 ATP Challenger Tour. It took place in Binghamton, United States between 22 and 28 July 2019.

== Singles main-draw entrants ==
=== Seeds ===
Country	Player	Rank^{1}	Seed
~~ESP~~	~~Marcel Granollers~~	~~98~~	~~1~~
IND	Ramkumar Ramanathan	134	2
UKR	Sergiy Stakhovsky	145	3
ISR	Dudi Sela	159	4
USA	Noah Rubin	170	5
AUS	Marc Polmans	183	6
USA	Mitchell Krueger	192	7
USA	Thai-Son Kwiatkowski	206	8
ITA	Jannik Sinner	208	9
KOR	Lee Duck-hee	213	10
JPN	Yūichi Sugita	249	11
USA	JC Aragone	256	12
AUS	Max Purcell	261	13
BRA	João Menezes	266	14
RUS	Evgeny Karlovskiy	270	15
USA	J. J. Wolf	272	16

- ^{1} Rankings are as of July 15, 2019.

=== Other entrants ===
The following players received wildcards into the singles main draw:

- (United States) Andrew Fenty
- (United States) Mitchell Krueger
- (United States) Alexander Ritschard
- (United States) Noah Rubin
- (Ukraine) Sergiy Stakhovsky

The following player received entry into the singles main draw using a protected ranking:

- (United States) Raymond Sarmiento

The following players received entry into the singles main draw as alternates:

- (United States) John Paul Fruttero
- (United States) Nathan Pasha
- (United States) Karl Poling
- (United States) Nathan Ponwith
- (Portugal) Bernardo Saraiva
- (Ukraine) Volodymyr Uzhylovskyi

The following players received entry into the singles main draw using their ITF World Tennis Ranking:

- (United States) Preston Brown
- (United Kingdom) Lloyd Glasspool
- (Ecuador) Diego Hidalgo
- (United States) Strong Kirchheimer
- (Greece) Michail Pervolarakis
- (Russia) Alexey Zakharov

== Champions ==
=== Singles ===
- (Japan) Yūichi Sugita def. (Brazil) João Menezes 7–6^{(7–2)}, 1–6, 6–2.

=== Doubles ===
- (Australia) Max Purcell / (Australia) Luke Saville def. (United States) JC Aragone / (United States) Alex Lawson 6–4, 4–6, [10–5].
