= João Menezes =

Brazilian tennis player (born 1996)

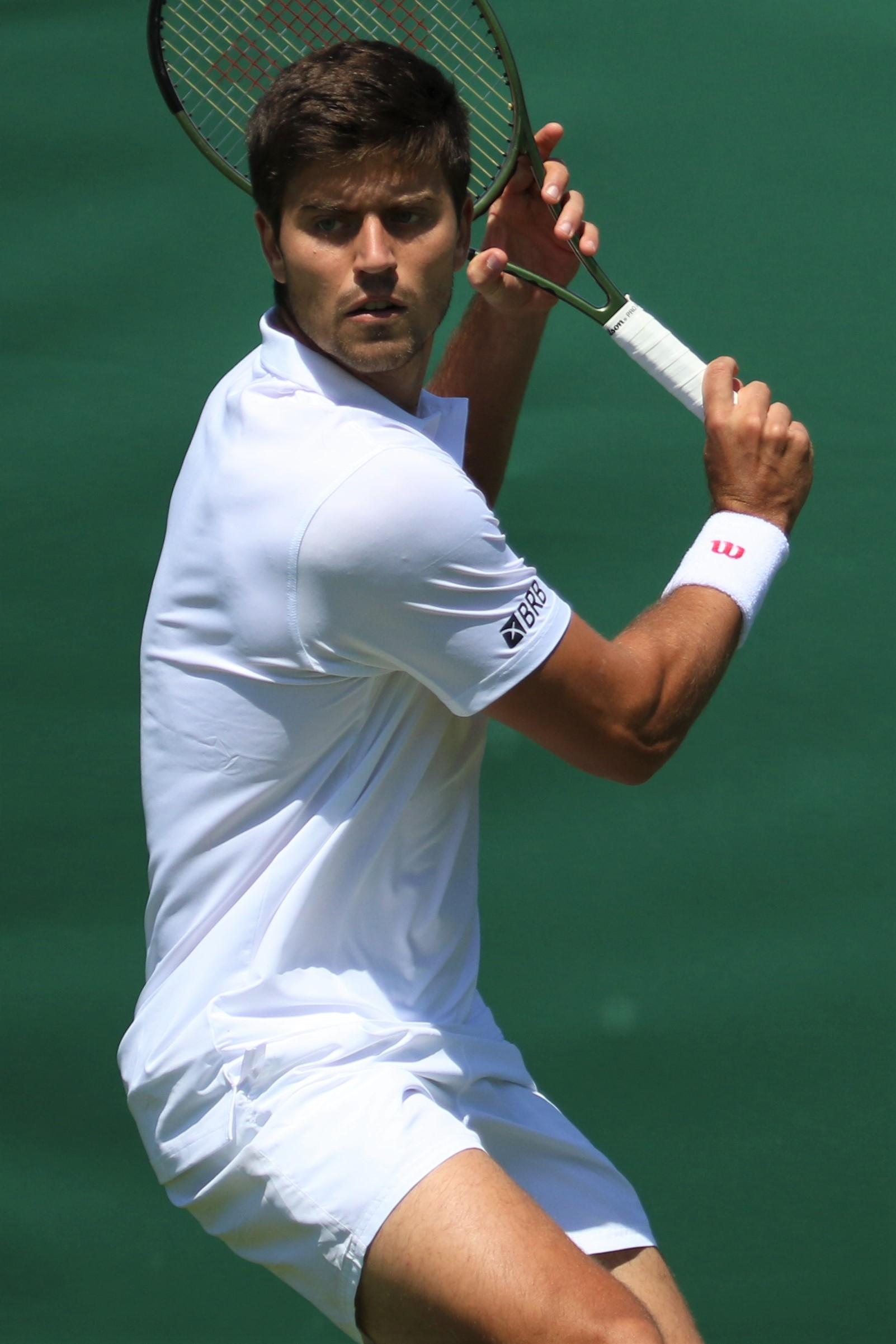
- Menezes at the 2022 Wimbledon Championships
- Full name: João Magalhães Hueb de Menezes
- Country (sports): Brazil
- Residence: Uberaba, Brazil
- Born: 17 December 1996 (age 29) Uberaba, Brazil
- Height: 1.85 m (6 ft 1 in)
- Turned pro: 2014
- Retired: 2024
- Plays: Right-handed (two-handed backhand)
- Coach: Patricio Arnold
- Prize money: $350,992

Singles
- Career record: 0–3
- Career titles: 0
- Highest ranking: No. 172 (17 February 2020)

Grand Slam singles results
- Australian Open: Q2 (2021)
- French Open: Q3 (2021)
- Wimbledon: Q2 (2022)
- US Open: Q3 (2019)

Other tournaments
- Olympic Games: 1R (2021)

Doubles
- Career record: 0–0
- Career titles: 0
- Highest ranking: No. 242 (13 September 2021)

Grand Slam doubles results
- US Open Junior: F (2014)
Medal record
Pan American Games
Gold medal – first place	2019 Lima	Men's singles

João Magalhães Hueb de Menezes (born 17 December 1996) is a Brazilian former professional tennis player. He has a career-high ATP singles ranking of world No. 172 achieved on 17 February 2020 and a career high doubles ranking of No. 242 achieved on 13 September 2021.

Menezes won the gold medal at the 2019 Pan American Games in Lima, defeating Chilean Tomás Barrios in the final. He has won one ATP Challenger singles title at the 2019 Samarkand Challenger as well as a total of 12 ITF Futures titles (5 singles and 7 doubles).

== Career ==
In June 2021, he qualified to represent Brazil at the 2020 Summer Olympics.

== Performance timelines ==
Key
W	F	SF	QF	#R	RR	Q#	P#	DNQ	A	Z#	PO	G	S	B	NMS	NTI	P	NH

(W) winner; (F) finalist; (SF) semifinalist; (QF) quarterfinalist; (#R) rounds 4, 3, 2, 1; (RR) round-robin stage; (Q#) qualification round; (P#) preliminary round; (DNQ) did not qualify; (A) absent; (Z#) Davis/Fed Cup Zonal Group (with number indication) or (PO) play-off; (G) gold, (S) silver or (B) bronze Olympic/Paralympic medal; (NMS) not a Masters tournament; (NTI) not a Tier I tournament; (P) postponed; (NH) not held; (SR) strike rate (events won / competed); (W–L) win–loss record.
To avoid confusion and double counting, these charts are updated at the conclusion of a tournament or when the player's participation has ended.

=== Singles ===
Current through the 2022 French Open.

Tournament	2019	2020	2021	2022	SR	W–L
Grand Slam tournaments
Australian Open	A	Q1	A	A	0 / 0	0–0
French Open	A	Q2	Q3	Q1	0 / 0	0–0
Wimbledon	A	NH	Q1	Q2	0 / 0	0–0
US Open	Q3	A	Q2	A	0 / 0	0–0
Win–loss	0–0	0–0	0–0	0–0	0 / 0	0–0
ATP World Tour Masters 1000
Indian Wells Masters	A	NH	A	A	0 / 0	0–0
Miami Open	A	NH	Q1	A	0 / 0	0–0
Monte-Carlo Masters	A	NH	A	A	0 / 0	0–0
Madrid Open	A	NH	A	A	0 / 0	0–0
Italian Open	A	A	A	A	0 / 0	0–0
Canadian Open	A	NH	A	A	0 / 0	0–0
Cincinnati Masters	A	A	A	A	0 / 0	0–0
Shanghai Masters	A	NH		A	0 / 0	0–0
Paris Masters	A	A	A	A	0 / 0	0–0
Win–loss	0–0	0–0	0–0	0–0	0 / 0	0–0
National representation
Davis Cup	Z1	A	A		0 / 1	0–1
Summer Olympics	Not Held		1R	NH	0 / 1	0–1
Career statistics
	2019	2020	2021	2022	Career	
Tournaments	1	0	2	0	3	
Titles / Finals	0 / 0	0 / 0	0 / 0	0 / 0	0 / 0	
Overall win–loss	0–1	0–0	0–2	0–0	0–3	
Year-end ranking	189	194	250	955	0%	

== Davis Cup ==
Legend
Group membership
World Group (0–0)
Group I (0–1)
Group II (0)
Group III (0)
Group IV (0)

- ▲ ▼ indicates the outcome of the Davis Cup match followed by the score, date, place of event, the zonal classification and its phase, and the court surface.

Rubber outcome	Rubber	Match type (partner if any)	Opponent nation	Opponent player(s)	Score
▲3–1; 13–14 September 2019; Sociedade Recreativa Mampituba, Criciúma, Brazil; Group I Americas; Clay surface
Defeat	I	Singles	Barbados	Darian King	6–3, 4–6, 2–6

== ATP Challenger and ITF Futures finals ==
=== Singles: 10 (6 titles, 4 runner-ups) ===
Legend ATP Challenger Tour (1–1) ITF Futures (5–3)	Finals by surface Hard (2–2) Clay (4–2) Grass (0–0) Carpet (0–0)

Result	W–L	Date	Tournament	Tier	Surface	Opponent	Score
Loss	0–1	Feb 2015	USA F8, Plantation	Futures	Clay	(Argentina) Patricio Heras	4–6, 2–6
Loss	0–2	May 2015	Colombia F1, Pereira	Futures	Clay	(Ecuador) Emilio Gómez	5–7, 2–6
Win	1–2	Nov 2015	Brazil F7, Santa Maria	Futures	Clay	(Brazil) Orlando Luz	6–2, 7–6^{(7–5)}
Win	2–2	Oct 2016	Ecuador F2, Quito	Futures	Clay	(Bolivia) Federico Zeballos	6–3, 3–6, 7–5
Win	3–2	Sep 2017	Spain F28, Oviedo	Futures	Clay	(Spain) Eduard Esteve Lobato	6–3, 6–4
Win	4–2	Apr 2018	Nigeria F1, Abuja	Futures	Hard	(Sweden) Markus Eriksson	6–2, 6–4
Loss	4–3	Apr 2018	Nigeria F2, Abuja	Futures	Hard	(Austria) Maximilian Neuchrist	3–6, 7–6^{(7–5)}, 2–6
Win	5–3	May 2018	Nigeria F3, Abuja	Futures	Hard	(India) Arjun Kadhe	6–3, 6–1
Win	6–3	May 2019	Samarkand, Uzbekistan	Challenger	Clay	(France) Corentin Moutet	7–6^{(7–2)}, 7–6^{(9–7)}
Loss	6–4	Jul 2019	Binghamton, USA	Challenger	Hard	(Japan) Yūichi Sugita	6–7^{(2–7)}, 6–1, 2–6

=== Doubles: 10 (8 titles, 2 runner-ups) ===
Legend ATP Challenger Tour (1–1) ITF Futures (7–1)	Finals by surface Hard (2–0) Clay (6–2) Grass (0–0) Carpet (0–0)

Result	W–L	Date	Tournament	Tier	Surface	Partner	Opponents	Score
Loss	0–1	Sep 2013	Brazil F8, Caxias do Sul	Futures	Clay	(Brazil) Evaldo Neto	(Brazil) Fabrício Neis (Brazil) João Pedro Sorgi	3–6, 6–3, [6–10]
Win	1–1	Mar 2015	USA F9, Sunrise	Futures	Clay	(Brazil) Rafael Matos	(Brazil) Bruno Sant'Anna (Brazil) Thales Turini	7–5, 2–6, [10–5]
Win	2–1	May 2015	Colombia F1, Pereira	Futures	Clay	(Brazil) João Walendowsky	(Colombia) Felipe Escobar (Colombia) Juan Sebastián Gómez	6–3, 5–7, [11–9]
Win	3–1	Oct 2016	Colombia F4, Valledupar	Futures	Hard	(Brazil) Rafael Matos	(Colombia) José Daniel Bendeck (Argentina) Gregorio Cordonnier	6–3, 3–6, [10–5]
Win	4–1	Oct 2016	Ecuador F1, Quito	Futures	Clay	(Brazil) Rafael Matos	(Argentina) Matías Franco Descotte (United States) Raleigh Smith	6–1, 6–4
Win	5–1	Dec 2016	Uruguay F2, Paysandú	Futures	Clay	(Brazil) Rafael Matos	(Brazil) Oscar José Gutierrez (Brazil) Nicolas Santos	6–0, 6–4
Win	6–1	Sep 2017	Spain F28, Oviedo	Futures	Clay	(Argentina) Franco Agamenone	(Norway) Viktor Durasovic (Spain) Miguel Semmler	7–5, 6–3
Win	7–1	Oct 2017	Egypt F31, Sharm El Sheikh	Futures	Hard	(Spain) David Jordà Sanchis	(Egypt) Youssef Hossam (Italy) Antonio Massara	6–3, 4–6, [10–8]
Win	8–1	Sep 2020	Iași, Romania	Challenger	Clay	(Brazil) Rafael Matos	(Philippines) Treat Huey (United States) Nathaniel Lammons	6–2, 6–2
Loss	8–2	Aug 2021	San Marino, San Marino	Challenger	Clay	(Brazil) Rafael Matos	(Czech Republic) Zdeněk Kolář (Venezuela) Luis David Martínez	6–1, 3–6, [3–10]

== Junior Grand Slam finals ==
=== Doubles: 1 (1 runner-up) ===
Result	Year	Tournament	Surface	Partner	Opponents	Score
Loss	2014	US Open	Hard	(Brazil) Rafael Matos	(Australia) Omar Jasika (Japan) Naoki Nakagawa	3–6, 6–7^{(6–8)}
