= 2010 Levene Gouldin & Thompson Tennis Challenger =

- Date: August 9 – August 15
- Edition: 17th
- Surface: Hard
- Location: Binghamton, New York, United States

Champions

Singles
- (Japan) Kei Nishikori

Doubles
- (Philippines) Treat Conrad Huey / (United Kingdom) Dominic Inglot
- Levene Gouldin & Thompson Tennis Challenger

The 2010 Levene Gouldin & Thompson Tennis Challenger was a professional tennis tournament played on outdoor hard courts. It was the seventeenth edition of the tournament which was part of the 2010 ATP Challenger Tour. It took place in Binghamton, New York, United States between 9 and 15 August 2010.

== ATP entrants ==
=== Seeds ===
Nationality	Player	Ranking*	Seeding
ARG	Brian Dabul	91	1
JPN	Go Soeda	112	2
LTU	Ričardas Berankis	133	3
AUS	Carsten Ball	146	4
USA	Kevin Kim	151	5
USA	Rajeev Ram	153	6
USA	Jesse Levine	161	7
USA	Robert Kendrick	163	8

- Rankings are as of August 2, 2010.

=== Other entrants ===
The following players received wildcards into the singles main draw:

- (United States) Adam El Mihdawy
- (United States) Bradley Klahn
- (Japan) Kei Nishikori
- (Russia) Dmitry Tursunov

The following players received entry from the qualifying draw:

- (United States) Alex Bogomolov Jr.
- (Australia) Adam Feeney
- (Australia) Chris Guccione
- (Australia) Dayne Kelly (as a Lucky Loser)
- (Australia) Brydan Klein (as a Lucky Loser)
- (Canada) Chris Klingemann
- (South Korea) Daniel Yoo (as a Lucky Loser)

== Champions ==
=== Singles ===
(Japan) Kei Nishikori def. (United States) Robert Kendrick, 6–3, 7–6(4)

=== Doubles ===
(Philippines) Treat Conrad Huey / (United Kingdom) Dominic Inglot def. (United States) Scott Lipsky / (United States) David Martin, 5–7, 7–6(2), [10–8]
