= Daniel Cox =

British tennis player

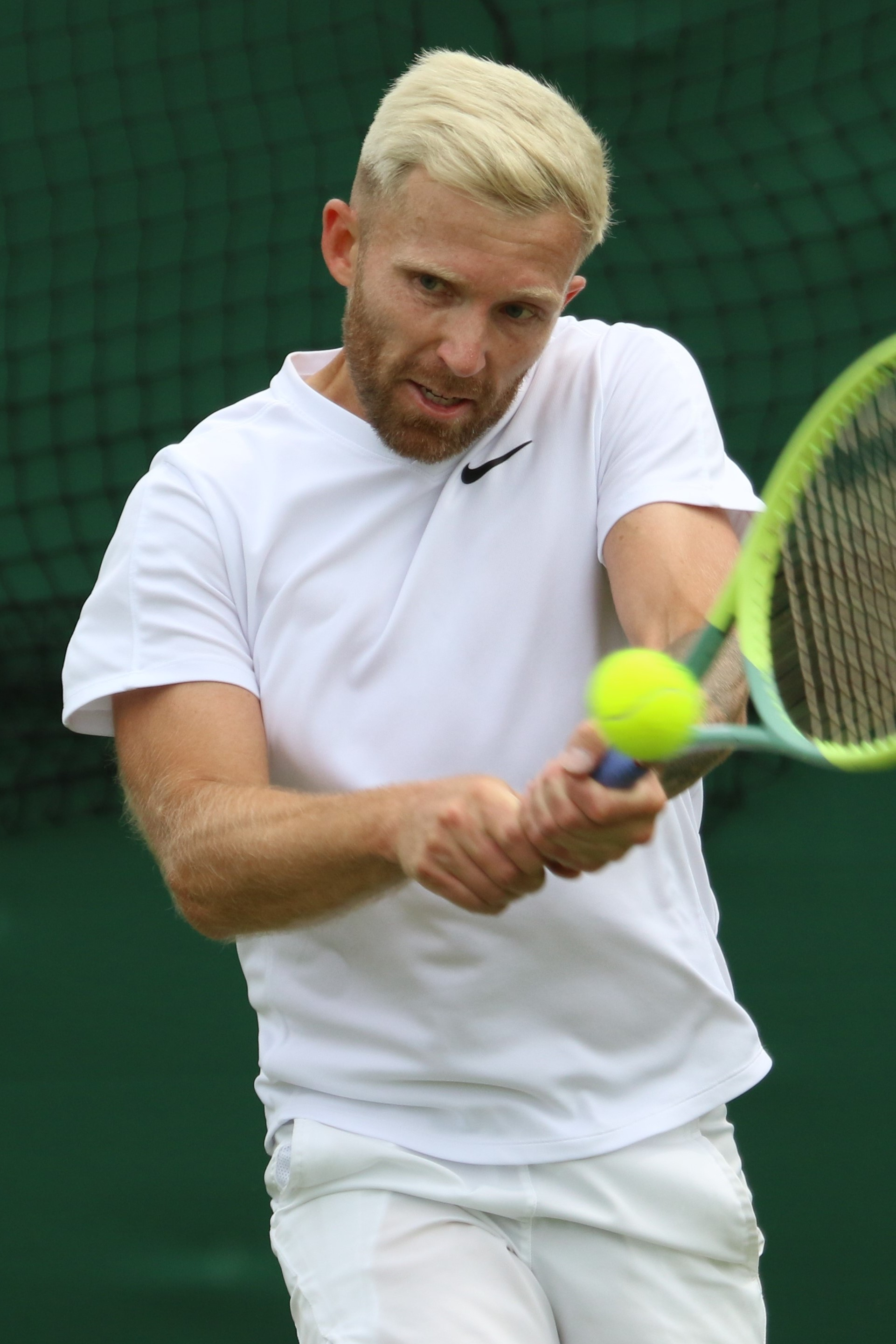
- Cox at the 2023 Wimbledon Championships
- Full name: Daniel Mark L. Cox
- Country (sports): (United Kingdom) Great Britain
- Residence: Lincoln, England
- Born: 28 September 1990 (age 35) Lincoln, England
- Height: 5 ft 7 in (1.70 m)
- Plays: Right-handed (two-handed backhand)
- Prize money: US$332,194

Singles
- Career record: 0–5
- Career titles: 0
- Highest ranking: No. 206 (28 July 2014)

Grand Slam singles results
- Australian Open: Q1 (2014)
- French Open: Q2 (2014)
- Wimbledon: 1R (2011, 2014)
- US Open: Q1 (2014)

Doubles
- Career record: 0–1
- Career titles: 0
- Highest ranking: No. 309 (6 April 2015)

Grand Slam doubles results
- Wimbledon: 1R (2011)

Daniel Mark L. Cox (born 28 September 1990 in Lincoln, England), is a British tennis player.

While playing tennis for Lincolnshire, he first came into international prominence when he reached the finals of Le Petit As, Tarbes. A right-hander who favours slow hardcourts, but seems to be comfortable on all surfaces, Cox choices to train at the Marco Tennis Academy, in Marbella, as a training base, favouring the warm weather training in Spain over that in the United Kingdom.

== Career ==
=== 2006 ===
Daniel spent the first few months of the year attempting to qualify for various Futures and Satellite tournaments. Although he came across little success initially, he finally qualified for a Futures event in Portugal before losing in the first round to an ATP top 500 player.

He took very little time to adjust himself to the 18-and-under circuits when he finally made his debut in April. He reached the semi-finals of a Grade 5 tournament in Sutton and followed it by a finals appearance in a Grade 5 tournament in Nottingham the very next week.

=== 2007 ===
Cox advanced to the second round of the Australian Open Boys' Singles championship before losing to Roman Jebavý of the Czech Republic. In the Boys' Doubles competition, Daniel reached the quarter-finals with Gastão Elias of Portugal.

=== 2011 ===
2011 was the best year of Cox's career to date, reaching a career high singles ranking of 258 and receiving a wildcard into both the men's singles and doubles at Wimbledon. In the singles, he lost 2–6, 4–6, 4–6 to Sergiy Stakhovsky in round one. In the doubles, he partnered James Ward, losing again in round one to Mikhail Kukushkin and Michael Russell, 6–4, 4–6, 4–6.

=== 2014 ===
In 2014, Cox reached the world's top 250 for the first time. He entered the Australian Open qualifiers for the first time in his career. He was defeated in the first round by American Denis Kudla.

After a few good wins in Challenger tours, Cox again entered the qualifying stage at a Grand Slam for the first time; this time it was Roland Garros. Cox defied the odds in the first round defeating Israel's Number 2 Amir Weintraub 6–2, 6–1. This was his first every victory in a Grand Slam qualification round outside of Wimbledon. In the second round he faced top qualifying seed – and world number 89 – Paolo Lorenzi and lost 3–6, 6–7.

Cox was rewarded with reaching a career high by receiving a wildcard to the main draw of Wimbledon. He lost in 4 sets to former top-25 player Jérémy Chardy 2–6, 6–7, 7–6, 3–6. After his defeat, Cox went to play on some more Challenger tours reaching the semi-finals in Binghamton before losing to Sergiy Stakhovsky. At Binghamton, Cox won his first ever title at Challenger level, teaming-up with fellow Brit Daniel Smethurst to win the Doubles, defeating Stakhovsky and Marius Copil in the final 6–7, 6–2, 10–6.

== Challenger and Futures/World Tennis Tour finals ==
=== Singles: 33 (16–17) ===
Legend (singles) ATP Challenger Tour (0–0) ITF Futures/World Tennis Tour (16–17)	Titles by surface Hard (12–12) Clay (0–1) Grass (2–4) Carpet (2–0)

Result	W–L	Date	Tournament	Tier	Surface	Opponent	Score
Win	1–0	Jun 2009	Norway F2, Gausdal	Futures	Hard	(Russia) Sergei Krotiouk	7–6^{(7–1)}, 6–3
Win	2–0	Jul 2010	Great Britain F10, Frinton-on-Sea	Futures	Grass	(United Kingdom) Josh Goodall	7–6^{(7–5)}, 6–2
Win	3–0	Jul 2010	Ireland F1, Dublin	Futures	Carpet	(Italy) Andrea Falgheri	6–1, 3–6, 6–3
Win	4–0	Sep 2010	Great Britain F13, London	Futures	Hard	(United Kingdom) Dan Evans	6–1, 6–1
Win	5–0	Sep 2010	Great Britain F15, Wrexham	Futures	Hard	(United Kingdom) Joshua Milton	7–6^{(7–1)}, 6–4
Win	6–0	Nov 2010	Israel F4, Ramat HaSharon	Futures	Hard	(Belgium) David Goffin	3–6, 6–4, 6–4
Loss	6–1	Mar 2011	USA F6, Harlingen	Futures	Hard	(Australia) Dayne Kelly	1–6, 3–6
Loss	6–2	Feb 2012	USA F5, Brownsville	Futures	Hard	(Canada) Peter Polansky	1–6, 3–6
Loss	6–3	Aug 2012	Great Britain F13, London	Futures	Hard	(United Kingdom) Dan Evans	2–6, 5–7
Loss	6–4	Apr 2013	Qatar F1, Doha	Futures	Hard	(Slovakia) Marek Semjan	6–3, 6–7^{(4–7)}, 6–7^{(6–8)}
Loss	6–5	Apr 2013	Great Britain F9, Bournemouth	Futures	Clay	(Croatia) Borna Ćorić	7–6^{(7–4)}, 4–6, 3–6
Win	7–5	Jul 2013	Great Britain F12, Manchester	Futures	Grass	(United Kingdom) Tom Farquharson	6–3, 6–2
Win	8–5	Jul 2013	Ireland F1, Dublin	Futures	Carpet	(France) Albano Olivetti	6–3, 6–3
Win	9–5	Aug 2013	Great Britain F15, Nottingham	Futures	Hard	(United Kingdom) Ashley Hewitt	6–4, 3–6, 6–1
Loss	9–6	Aug 2013	Great Britain F16, Chiswick	Futures	Hard	(Netherlands) Boy Westerhof	6–7^{(6–8)}, 2–6
Win	10–6	Aug 2013	Great Britain F17, Wrexham	Futures	Hard	(United Kingdom) Marcus Willis	6–2, 6–3
Win	11–6	Sep 2013	Great Britain F19, Roehampton	Futures	Hard	(United Kingdom) Josh Goodall	7–6^{(10–8)}, 2–2 ret.
Win	12–6	Apr 2014	Qatar F1, Doha	Futures	Hard	(Belgium) Yannick Mertens	6–3, 6–4
Win	13–6	Dec 2014	Qatar F4, Doha	Futures	Hard	(Switzerland) Adrien Bossel	6–4, 6–0
Loss	13–7	Jan 2015	Great Britain F1, Sheffield	Futures	Hard (i)	(United Kingdom) Daniel Smethurst	4–6, 4–6
Win	14–7	Jan 2015	Great Britain F2, Sunderland	Futures	Hard (i)	(United Kingdom) Alexander Ward	7–6^{(10–8)}, 6–3
Loss	14–8	Mar 2015	Great Britain F5, Shrewsbury	Futures	Hard (i)	(France) Quentin Halys	4–6, 6–3, 3–6
Loss	14–9	May 2015	Turkey F20, Antalya	Futures	Hard	(Italy) Erik Crepaldi	3–6, 4–6
Loss	14–10	Jul 2015	Great Britain F7, Felixstowe	Futures	Grass	(United Kingdom) Dan Evans	2–6, 1–6
Loss	14–11	Aug 2015	Egypt F27, Sharm El Sheikh	Futures	Hard	(South Africa) Lloyd Harris	2–6, 2–6
Loss	14–12	Sep 2015	Great Britain F9, Nottingham	Futures	Hard	(United Kingdom) Dan Evans	7–6^{(7–4)}, 3–6, 1–6
Win	15–12	Jul 2021	M15 Almada, Portugal	World Tennis Tour	Hard	(Portugal) Fábio Coelho	6–2, 5–7, 6–2
Win	16–12	Jan 2022	M25 Bath, Great Britain	World Tennis Tour	Hard (i)	(United Kingdom) Charles Broom	6–4, 7-6^{(7-5)}
Loss	16–13	Mar 2022	M15 Torelló, Spain	World Tennis Tour	Hard	(Spain) Imanol Lopez Morillo	4–6, 4–6
Loss	16–14	Jul 2022	M25 Nottingham, Great Britain	World Tennis Tour	Grass	(United Kingdom) Arthur Fery	5–7, 6–2, 5–7
Loss	16–15	Aug 2022	M25 Nottingham, Great Britain	World Tennis Tour	Grass	(United Kingdom) Alastair Gray	6–3, 4–6, 5–7
Loss	16–16	Apr 2023	M25 Nottingham, Great Britain	World Tennis Tour	Hard	(France) Jules Marie	3–6, 3–6
Loss	16–17	Jul 2023	M25 Roehampton, Great Britain	World Tennis Tour	Grass	(Australia) Luke Saville	4–6, 6–1, 1–6

=== Doubles: 10 (1–9) ===
Legend (doubles) ATP Challenger Tour (1–1) ITF Futures Tour (0–8)	Titles by surface Hard (1–9) Clay (0–0) Grass (0–0) Carpet (0–0)

Result	W–L	Date	Tournament	Tier	Surface	Partner	Opponents	Score
Loss	0–1	Oct 2008	Spain F36, Martos	Futures	Hard	(United Kingdom) Dan Evans	(Slovakia) Kamil Čapkovič (Russia) Dmitri Sitak	4–6, 5–2 ret.
Loss	0–2	Oct 2009	Great Britain F15, Chiswick	Futures	Hard (i)	(Belarus) Uladzimir Ignatik	(United Kingdom) Chris Eaton (United Kingdom) Dominic Inglot	0–6, 6–7^{(5–7)}
Loss	0–3	Sep 2011	USA F24, Costa Mesa	Futures	Hard	(Australia) Adam Hubble	(United Kingdom) Chris Eaton (United Kingdom) Neal Skupski	3–6, 3–6
Loss	0–4	Oct 2011	Great Britain F17, Cardiff	Futures	Hard (i)	(United Kingdom) Daniel Smethurst	(United Kingdom) Oliver Golding (United Kingdom) Sean Thornley	4–6, 4–6
Loss	0–5	Sep 2013	Great Britain F18, Sheffield	Futures	Hard	(United Kingdom) Richard Bloomfield	(United Kingdom) Lewis Burton (United Kingdom) Marcus Willis	1–6, 1–6
Loss	0–6	May 2014	Anning, China	Challenger	Hard	(China) Gong Maoxin	(Australia) Alex Bolt (Australia) Andrew Whittington	4–6, 3–6
Win	1–6	Jul 2014	Binghamton, US	Challenger	Hard	(United Kingdom) Daniel Smethurst	(Romania) Marius Copil (Ukraine) Sergiy Stakhovsky	6–7^{(3–7)}, 6–2, [10–6]
Loss	1–7	Mar 2015	Great Britain F4, Wirral	Futures	Hard (i)	(United Kingdom) David Rice	(Netherlands) Antal van der Duim (Netherlands) Boy Westerhof	2–6, 6–4, [2–10]
Loss	1–8	Sep 2015	Great Britain F9, Nottingham	Futures	Hard	(United Kingdom) David Rice	(United Kingdom) Lloyd Glasspool (United Kingdom) Joshua Ward-Hibbert	4–6, 6–3, [7–10]
Loss	1–9	Apr 2016	Qatar F1, Doha	Futures	Hard	(Sweden) Milos Sekulic	(Switzerland) Antoine Bellier (France) Benjamin Bonzi	2–6, 3–6
