= Bruno Semenzato =

Brazilian tennis player

- Country (sports): Brazil
- Born: 11 July 1992 (age 33) São Paulo, Brazil
- Height: 1.75 m (5 ft 9 in)
- Plays: Right-handed (two-handed backhand)
- College: Duke University
- Prize money: $16,310

Singles
- Career record: 0–0 (at ATP Tour level, Grand Slam level, and in Davis Cup)
- Career titles: 0 ITF
- Highest ranking: No. 714 (14 November 2011)

Doubles
- Career record: 0–1 (at ATP Tour level, Grand Slam level, and in Davis Cup)
- Career titles: 3 ITF
- Highest ranking: No. 612 (3 October 2011)
- Last updated on: 20 February 2017.

Bruno Semenzato (born 11 July 1992) is a Brazilian tennis player.

Semenzato has a career high ATP singles ranking of 714 achieved on 14 November 2011. He also has a career high ATP doubles ranking of 612, achieved on 3 October 2011.

Semenzato made his ATP main draw debut at the 2011 Farmers Classic in the doubles draw partnering Márcio Torres. Semenzato played college tennis at Duke University.
