= Daniel Nguyen =

Vietnamese American tennis player

Daniel Cao Nguyen
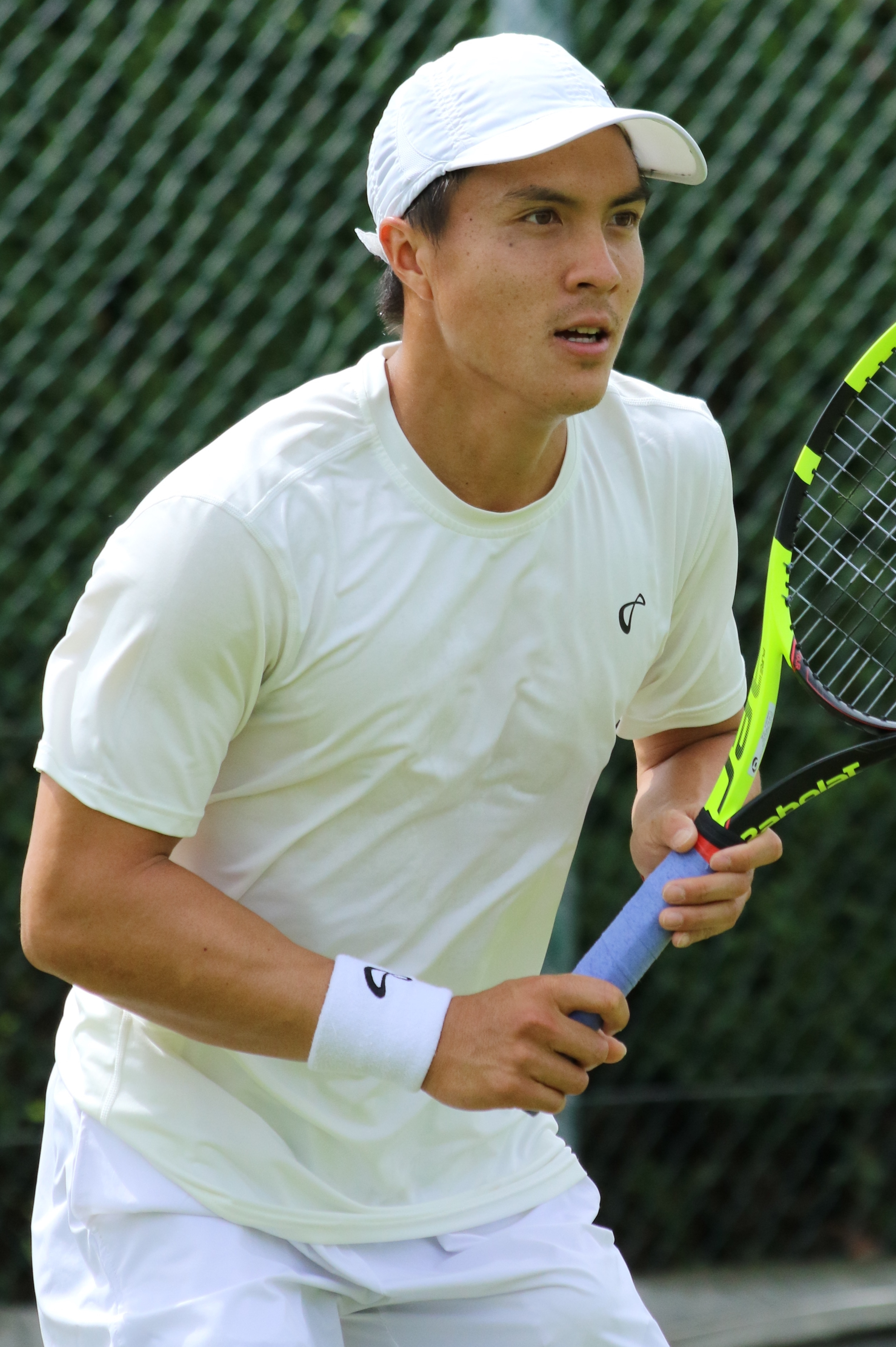
- Country (sports): Vietnam (2019–present); United States (2009–2019)
- Residence: Oxnard, California, USA
- Born: October 16, 1990 (age 35) Long Beach, California, USA
- Turned pro: 2013
- Plays: Right-Handed (Two-Handed Backhand)
- College: University of Southern California
- Coach: Amir Marandy
- Prize money: $207,521

Singles
- Career record: 0–0
- Career titles: 0
- Highest ranking: No. 189 (July 13, 2015)

Grand Slam singles results
- Australian Open: Q1 (2016)
- French Open: Q1 (2016)
- Wimbledon: Q2 (2016)
- US Open: Q2 (2015)

Doubles
- Career record: 0–2
- Career titles: 0
- Highest ranking: No. 340 (July 18, 2016)

Grand Slam doubles results
- US Open: 1R (2009, 2016)
Medal record
Men's Tennis
Representing Vietnam
Southeast Asian Games
| Silver medal – second place | 2019 Philippines | Singles |
| Bronze medal – third place | 2019 Philippines | Doubles |
- Last updated on: 31 January 2023.

Daniel Cao Nguyen (born October 16, 1990) is an inactive tennis player. He is the first Vietnamese American to play in the US Open tennis tournament. He has won a total of 15 singles and 5 doubles Futures titles and 2 doubles Challenger titles as of December 2019.

Daniel Nguyen is a graduate of Santa Barbara High School and the University of Southern California (USC). Nguyen was part of the USC team that won the NCAA Team Championship title four consecutive years. Other accomplishments include winning the Boys 16s & 18s Doubles National Championships in Kalamazoo, being named the NCAA Tournament Most Outstanding Player in his sophomore year, and clinching the 2009–10 and 2010-11 NCAA Championships for USC.

In the 2009 US Open, he and former teammate JT Sundling were defeated 3–6, 6–2, 6–1 in the first-round of the men's doubles tournament by Máximo González and Juan Mónaco. They qualified after winning the Boy's Junior National Tennis Championship Doubles Title in 2009.

Daniel Nguyen is playing for the Hai Dang - Tay Ninh team. He obtained Vietnamese citizenship on 28 October 2019 and has played under the Vietnamese flag since then. He won the silver medal in an all-Vietnamese men's singles final at the 30th SEA games in the Philippines in December 2019. His compatriot Ly Hoang Nam in the final won the first ever tennis gold medal for Vietnam.
