= Levene Gouldin & Thompson Tennis Challenger =

- 2019 Levene Gouldin & Thompson Tennis Challenger

Defunct tennis tournament
- Location: Binghamton, New York, United States
- Venue: Recreation park tennis courts
- Category: ATP Challenger Tour
- Surface: Hard / Outdoors
- Draw: 32S/16Q/16D
- Prize money: $50,000
- Website: Website

The Levene Gouldin & Thompson Tennis Challenger was a tennis tournament held in Binghamton, New York, United States from 1994-2019. A Binghamton and Vestal area law firm, Levene Gouldin & Thompson, was the title sponsor of the tournament from 2007 until the event's conclusion. The event was part of the ATP challenger series and was played on outdoor hard courts. Former Wimbledon champion and Olympic Gold medalist Andy Murray won the event in 2005.

The 2020 and 2021 tournaments were cancelled due to the COVID-19 pandemic and quarantine. In 2022, Tennis Charities of Binghamton announced that the protocols necessary for managing the pandemic required the cancellation of the 2022 event. In 2023, the Tennis Charities of Binghamton announced that the event would be permanently cancelled, as the venue no longer qualifies as sufficient due to updated guidelines from the Association of Tennis Professionals.

== Past finals ==
=== Singles ===
Year	Champion	Runner-up	Score
2019	(Japan) Yūichi Sugita	(Brazil) João Menezes	7–6^{(7–2)}, 1–6, 6–2
2018	(United Kingdom) Jay Clarke	(Australia) Jordan Thompson	6–7^{(6–8)}, 7–6^{(7–5)}, 6–4
2017	(United Kingdom) Cameron Norrie	(Australia) Jordan Thompson	6–4, 0–6, 6–4
2016	(Barbados) Darian King	(United States) Mitchell Krueger	6–2, 6–3
2015	(United Kingdom) Kyle Edmund	(United States) Bjorn Fratangelo	6–2, 6–3
2014	(Ukraine) Sergiy Stakhovsky	(United States) Wayne Odesnik	6–4, 7–6^{(11–9)}
2013	(United States) Alex Kuznetsov	(United States) Bradley Klahn	6–4, 3–6, 6–3
2012	(United States) Michael Yani	(South Africa) Fritz Wolmarans	6–4, 7–6^{(13–11)}
2011	(Chile) Paul Capdeville	(United States) Wayne Odesnik	7–6^{(7–4)}, 6–3
2010	(Japan) Kei Nishikori	(United States) Robert Kendrick	6–3, 7–6^{(7–4)}
2009	(Chile) Paul Capdeville	(South Africa) Kevin Anderson	7–6^{(9–7)}, 7–6^{(13–11)}
2008	(Chile) Paul Capdeville	(United States) Rajeev Ram	4–6, 6–3, 6–1
2007	(Sweden) Thomas Johansson	(Serbia) Dušan Vemić	6–4, 7–6
2006	(United States) Scott Oudsema	(Slovakia) Lukáš Lacko	7–6, 6–2
2005	(United Kingdom) Andy Murray	(Colombia) Alejandro Falla	7–6, 6–3
2004	(Israel) Noam Okun	(Thailand) Danai Udomchoke	6–3, 4–6, 6–1
2003	(Croatia) Ivo Karlović	(France) Nicolas Thomann	7–6, 6–7, 7–6
2002	(Australia) Scott Draper	(Australia) Peter Luczak	7–6, 6–4
2001	(France) Cedric Kauffmann	(Israel) Noam Behr	7–5, 6–1
2000	(Japan) Takao Suzuki	(South Korea) Yoon Yong-il	6–1, 6–4
1999	(France) Antony Dupuis	(New Zealand) Brett Steven	6–7, 6–1, 6–4
1998	(Japan) Takao Suzuki	(Italy) Diego Nargiso	5–2, RET.
1997	(United States) David Witt	(United States) Brian MacPhie	6–2, 6–4
1996	(Italy) Vincenzo Santopadre	(Armenia) Sargis Sargsian	6–3, 3–6, 6–3
1995	(Japan) Shuzo Matsuoka	(Australia) Jamie Morgan	2–6, 7–6, 6–3
1994	(India) Leander Paes	(United States) David Witt	6–4, 6–2

=== Doubles ===
Year	Champion	Runner-up	Score
2019	(Australia) Max Purcell (Australia) Luke Saville	(United States) JC Aragone (United States) Alex Lawson	6–4, 4–6, [10–5]
2018	(Spain) Gerard Granollers (Spain) Marcel Granollers	(Colombia) Alejandro Gómez (Brazil) Caio Silva	7–6^{(7–2)}, 6–4
2017	(United States) Denis Kudla (United States) Daniel Nguyen	(Australia) Jarryd Chaplin (Australia) Luke Saville	6–3, 7–6^{(7–5)}
2016	(Australia) Matt Reid (Australia) John-Patrick Smith	(United Kingdom) Liam Broady (Brazil) Guilherme Clezar	6–4, 6–2
2015	(South Africa) Dean O'Brien (South Africa) Ruan Roelofse	(United States) Daniel Nguyen (United States) Dennis Novikov	6–1, 7–6^{(7–0)}
2014	(United Kingdom) Daniel Cox (United Kingdom) Daniel Smethurst	(Romania) Marius Copil (Ukraine) Sergiy Stakhovsky	6–7(3), 6–2, [10–6]
2013	(United States) Bradley Klahn (New Zealand) Michael Venus	(Australia) Adam Feeney (Australia) John-Patrick Smith	6–3, 6–4
2012	(Israel) Dudi Sela (Israel) Harel Srugo	(Switzerland) Adrien Bossel (United States) Michael McClune	6–2, 3–6, [10]
2011	(Colombia) Juan Sebastián Cabal (Colombia) Robert Farah	(Philippines) Treat Conrad Huey (Denmark) Frederik Nielsen	6–4, 6–3
2010	(Philippines) Treat Conrad Huey (United Kingdom) Dominic Inglot	(United States) Scott Lipsky (United States) David Martin	5–7, 7–6(2), [10–8]
2009	(South Africa) Rik de Voest (United States) Scott Lipsky	(Australia) Carsten Ball (United States) Kaes Van't Hof	7–6(2), 6–4
2008	(Australia) Carsten Ball (United States) Travis Rettenmaier	(United States) Brian Battistone (United States) Dann Battistone	6–3, 6–4
2007	(United States) Scott Oudsema (United States) Ryan Sweeting	(United Kingdom) Richard Bloomfield (South Korea) Im Kyu-tae	7–6, 7–5
2006	(United States) Scott Lipsky (United States) David Martin	(United Kingdom) Colin Fleming (United Kingdom) Jamie Murray	7–5, 5–7, [10–3]
2005	(United States) Huntley Montgomery (United States) Tripp Phillips	(United States) Alex Bogomolov Jr. (United States) Travis Rettenmaier	6–3, 6–2
2004	(United States) Huntley Montgomery (United States) Tripp Phillips	(South Africa) Rik de Voest (Australia) Nathan Healey	7–6, 7–6
2003	(Israel) Jonathan Erlich (Israel) Andy Ram	(Australia) Stephen Huss (South Africa) Myles Wakefield	6–4, 6–3
2002	(United States) Paul Goldstein (United States) Scott Humphries	(Israel) Amir Hadad (United States) Robert Kendrick	4–6, 7–6, 7–5
2001	(Canada) Bobby Kokavec (Canada) Frédéric Niemeyer	(Israel) Amir Hadad (Canada) Andrew Nisker	2–6, 6–4, 6–1
2000	(South Africa) Justin Bower (South Africa) Jeff Coetzee	(Switzerland) Lorenzo Manta (Italy) Laurence Tieleman	6–3, 7–5
1999	(United States) Mitch Sprengelmeyer (South Africa) Jason Weir-Smith	(United States) Kevin Kim (South Korea) Lee Hyung-taik	5–7, 6–4, 6–2
1998	(South Africa) Myles Wakefield (South Africa) Wesley Whitehouse	(Czech Republic) Petr Luxa (Mexico) Bernardo Martínez	7–5, 2–6, 7–5
1997	(United States) Brian MacPhie (United States) Jeff Salzenstein	(Portugal) Emanuel Couto (Egypt) Tamer El Sawy	7–5, 6–7, 6–3
1996	(United States) Justin Gimelstob (United States) Jeff Salzenstein	(United States) David DiLucia (United States) Kenny Thorne	6–2, 6–4
1995	(United States) Scott Humphries (United States) Adam Peterson	(Australia) Neil Borwick (Australia) Jamie Morgan	7–6, 6–2
1994	(United States) David DiLucia (United States) Chris Woodruff	(South Africa) Neville Godwin (United States) Scott Sigerseth	4–6, 6–4, 6–3
