= 2019 Challenger Banque Nationale de Gatineau =

- Date: July 15–21
- Edition: 4th (men); 6th (women)
- Category: ATP Challenger Tour; ITF Women's Circuit
- Surface: Hard – outdoors
- Location: Gatineau, Canada
- Venue: Parc de l'Île

Champions

Men's singles
- (Australia) Jason Kubler

Women's singles
- (Canada) Leylah Annie Fernandez

Men's doubles
- (United States) Alex Lawson / (Australia) Marc Polmans

Women's doubles
- (Canada) Leylah Annie Fernandez / (Canada) Rebecca Marino
← 2018 ·	Challenger de Gatineau	· 2020 →

The 2019 Challenger Banque Nationale de Gatineau was a professional tennis tournament played on outdoor hard courts. It was the 4th edition of the tournament for men and the 6th for women, and it was part of the 2019 ATP Challenger Tour and the 2019 ITF Women's World Tennis Tour. It took place in Gatineau, Canada between July 15 and 21, 2019.

== Men's singles main-draw entrants ==
=== Seeds ===
Country	Player	Rank^{1}	Seed
FRA	Antoine Hoang	103	1
KOR	Kwon Soon-woo	125	2
CAN	Peter Polansky	139	3
USA	Michael Mmoh	152	4
ISR	Dudi Sela	154	5
SVK	Norbert Gombos	158	6
DEN	Mikael Torpegaard	172	7
JPN	Yasutaka Uchiyama	180	8
~~CAN~~	~~Vasek Pospisil~~	~~187~~	~~9~~
AUS	Jason Kubler	188	10
AUS	Marc Polmans	189	11
BAR	Darian King	190	12
FRA	Maxime Janvier	191	13
~~AUS~~	~~Thanasi Kokkinakis~~	~~192~~	~~14~~
FRA	Enzo Couacaud	214	15
KOR	Lee Duck-hee	217	16

- ^{1} Rankings are as of July 1, 2019.

=== Other entrants ===
The following players received wildcards into the singles main draw:

- (Canada) Liam Draxl
- (Canada) Alexis Galarneau
- (United States) Brandon Holt
- (Canada) ~~Vasek Pospisil~~
- (Canada) Benjamin Sigouin

The following player received entry into the singles main draw using a protected ranking:

- (Spain) Carlos Gómez-Herrera

The following player received entry into the singles main draw as an alternate:

- (Austria) Maximilian Neuchrist

The following players received entry into the singles main draw using their ITF World Tennis Ranking:

- (United States) Jordi Arconada
- (United Kingdom) Evan Hoyt
- (Japan) Shintaro Imai
- (Tunisia) Skander Mansouri
- (Chile) Alejandro Tabilo

The following players received entry from the qualifying draw:

- (Australia) Jacob Grills
- (United States) Dennis Novikov

The following player received entry as a lucky loser:

- (United Kingdom) Brydan Klein

== Women's singles main-draw entrants ==
=== Seeds ===
Country	Player	Rank^{1}	Seed
CAN	Katherine Sebov	212	1
~~AUS~~	~~Maddison Inglis~~	~~237~~	~~2~~
AUS	Olivia Rogowska	241	3
JPN	Momoko Kobori	254	4
JPN	Risa Ozaki	257	5
CAN	Françoise Abanda	261	6
SUI	Susan Bandecchi	317	7
USA	Quinn Gleason	347	8

- ^{1} Rankings are as of July 1, 2019.

=== Other entrants ===
The following players received wildcards into the singles main draw:

- (Canada) Françoise Abanda
- (Canada) Petra Januskova
- (Canada) Layne Sleeth
- (Canada) Carol Zhao

The following players received entry into the singles main draw using their ITF World Tennis Ranking:

- (United States) Dasha Ivanova
- (Russia) Anna Morgina
- (United States) Madison Westby
- (Mexico) Marcela Zacarías
- (United States) Amy Zhu

The following players received entry from the qualifying draw:

- (Canada) Carson Branstine
- (Canada) Jada Bui
- (United States) Victoria Emma
- (United States) Haley Giavara
- (Moldova) Alexandra Perper
- (United States) Holly Verner

The following player received entry as a lucky loser:

- (Australia) Alexandra Osborne

== Champions ==
=== Men's singles ===
- (Australia) Jason Kubler def. (France) Enzo Couacaud 6–4, 6–4.

=== Women's singles ===
- (Canada) Leylah Annie Fernandez def. (Canada) Carson Branstine, 3–6, 6–1, 6–2

=== Men's doubles ===
- (United States) Alex Lawson / (Australia) Marc Polmans def. (Mexico) Hans Hach Verdugo / (United States) Dennis Novikov 6–4, 3–6, [10–7].

=== Women's doubles ===
- (Canada) Leylah Annie Fernandez / (Canada) Rebecca Marino def. (Chinese Taipei) Hsu Chieh-yu / (Mexico) Marcela Zacarías, 7–6^{(7–5)}, 6–3
