= 2016 Challenger Banque Nationale de Gatineau =

- Date: August 8–14
- Edition: 1st (men); 3rd (women)
- Category: ATP Challenger Tour; ITF Women's Circuit
- Prize money: US$75,000 (men); US$25,000 (women)
- Surface: Hard – outdoors
- Location: Gatineau, Canada
- Venue: Parc de l'Île

Champions

Men's singles
- (Canada) Peter Polansky

Women's singles
- (Canada) Bianca Andreescu

Men's doubles
- (France) Tristan Lamasine / (Croatia) Franko Škugor

Women's doubles
- (Canada) Bianca Andreescu / (Canada) Charlotte Robillard-Millette
← 2015 ·	Challenger de Gatineau	· 2017 →

The 2016 Challenger Banque Nationale de Gatineau was a professional tennis tournament played on outdoor hard courts. It was the 1st edition of the tournament for men and the 3rd for women, and it was part of the 2016 ATP Challenger Tour and the 2016 ITF Women's Circuit, offering totals of $75,000 for men and $25,000 for women in prize money. It took place in Gatineau, Canada between August 8 and August 14, 2016.

== Men's singles main-draw entrants ==
=== Seeds ===
Country	Player	Rank^{1}	Seed
FRA	Quentin Halys	141	1
~~USA~~	~~Frances Tiafoe~~	~~149~~	~~2~~
IND	Saketh Myneni	150	3
COL	Alejandro González	156	4
FRA	Vincent Millot	181	5
CRO	Franko Škugor	186	6
AUS	Andrew Whittington	188	7
EST	Jürgen Zopp	191	8

- ^{1} Rankings are as of August 1, 2016

=== Other entrants ===
The following players received wildcards into the singles main draw:

- (Canada) Filip Peliwo
- (Canada) Brayden Schnur
- (Canada) Denis Shapovalov
- (Canada) Alejandro Tabilo

The following player entered the singles main draw with a protected ranking:

- (Croatia) Matija Pecotić

The following players received entry from the qualifying draw:

- (Canada) Félix Auger-Aliassime
- (Australia) Greg Jones
- (Venezuela) Luis David Martínez
- (New Zealand) Finn Tearney

The following players received entry as lucky losers:

- (Canada) Pavel Krainik
- (Canada) Samuel Monette

== Women's singles main-draw entrants ==
=== Seeds ===
Country	Player	Rank^{1}	Seed
~~USA~~	~~Jennifer Brady~~	~~147~~	~~1~~
CZE	Barbora Štefková	174	2
CAN	Françoise Abanda	230	3
USA	Lauren Albanese	263	4
MEX	Victoria Rodríguez	286	5
GBR	Katy Dunne	289	6
USA	Bernarda Pera	292	7
USA	Francesca Di Lorenzo	347	8

- ^{1} Rankings are as of August 1, 2016

=== Other entrants ===
The following players received wildcards into the singles main draw:

- (Canada) Bianca Andreescu
- (Canada) Petra Januskova
- (Canada) Erin Routliffe
- (Canada) Vanessa Wong

The following players received entry from the qualifying draw:

- (Canada) Isabelle Boulais
- (Australia) Lizette Cabrera
- (United States) Jessica Failla
- (United States) Dasha Ivanova
- (Russia) Nika Kukharchuk
- (United States) Alexandra Morozova
- (Canada) Charlotte Robillard-Millette
- (United States) Kristina Smith

The following player received entry as a lucky loser:

- (Canada) Anne-Sophie Courteau

== Champions ==
=== Men's singles ===
- (Canada) Peter Polansky def. (France) Vincent Millot, 3–6, 6–4, ret.

=== Women's singles ===
- (Canada) Bianca Andreescu def. (United States) Ellie Halbauer, 6–2, 7–5

=== Men's doubles ===
- (France) Tristan Lamasine / (Croatia) Franko Škugor def. (Australia) Jarryd Chaplin / (Australia) John-Patrick Smith, 6–3, 6–1

=== Women's doubles ===
- (Canada) Bianca Andreescu / (Canada) Charlotte Robillard-Millette def. (Japan) Mana Ayukawa / (United Kingdom) Samantha Murray, 4–6, 6–4, [10–6]
