= 2018 Challenger Banque Nationale de Gatineau – Men's doubles =

Men's doubles
- 2018 Challenger Banque Nationale de Gatineau

Final
- Champions: (United States) Robert Galloway (United States) Bradley Klahn
- Runners-up: (Barbados) Darian King (Canada) Peter Polansky
- Score: 7–6^{(7–4)}, 4–6, [10–8]

Events
Singles	men	women
Doubles	men	women
← 2017 ·	Challenger de Gatineau	· 2019 →

Bradley Klahn and Jackson Withrow were the defending champions but only Klahn chose to defend his title, partnering Robert Galloway. Klahn successfully defended his title.

Klahn and Galloway won the title after defeating Darian King and Peter Polansky 7–6^{(7–4)}, 4–6, [10–8] in the final.

== Seeds ==
1. (Australia) Bradley Mousley / (Australia) Matt Reid (semifinals)
2. (United States) Robert Galloway / (United States) Bradley Klahn (champions)
3. (Austria) Lucas Miedler / (Austria) Maximilian Neuchrist (first round)
4. (Barbados) Darian King / (Canada) Peter Polansky (final)

== Draw ==
=== Key ===
- Q = Qualifier
- WC = Wild card
- LL = Lucky loser
- Alt = Alternate
- SE = Special exempt
- PR = Protected ranking
- ITF = ITF entry
- JE = Junior exempt
- w/o = Walkover
- r = Retired
- d = Defaulted
- SR = Special ranking

First round
1	(Australia) B Mousley (Australia) M Reid	6	6
(Italy) S Napolitano (Canada) B Schnur	4	4
(United States) H Johnson (United States) Y Johnson	6	3	[11]
(France) A Escoffier (France) U Humbert	4	6	[9]
4	(Barbados) D King (Canada) P Polansky	7^{13}	7
(United Kingdom) L Broady (Belgium) J De Loore	6^{11}	5
(Japan) Shintaro Imai (Japan) K Uchida	6	7^{7}
(Japan) Y Takahashi (Japan) Renta Tokuda	4	6^{3}
(Lithuania) L Grigelis (Israel) E Leshem	6	6
WC	(Canada) J Boulais (Canada) Pavel Krainik	2	4
(United States) M Krueger (United States) A Lawson	7^{10}	7^{7}
3	(Austria) L Miedler (Austria) M Neuchrist	6^{8}	6^{4}
WC	(Canada) A Galarneau (Canada) B Sigouin	6	6
(China) Z Li (Canada) F Peliwo	1	3
WC	(Canada) JM Lin (Canada) Nicaise Muamba	3	3
2	(United States) R Galloway (United States) B Klahn	6	6

Quarterfinals
1	(Australia) B Mousley (Australia) M Reid	6	6^{2}	[10]
(United States) H Johnson (United States) Y Johnson	3	7^{7}	[3]
4	(Barbados) D King (Canada) P Polansky	4	7^{7}	[10]
(Japan) S Imai (Japan) K Uchida	6	6^{4}	[3]
(Lithuania) L Grigelis (Israel) E Leshem	6^{4}	7^{10}	[13]
(United States) M Krueger (United States) A Lawson	7^{7}	6^{8}	[11]
WC	(Canada) A Galarneau (Canada) B Sigouin	5	5
2	(United States) R Galloway (United States) B Klahn	7	7

Semifinals
1	(Australia) B Mousley (Australia) M Reid	4	2
4	(Barbados) D King (Canada) P Polansky	6	6
(Lithuania) L Grigelis (Israel) E Leshem	4	5
2	(United States) R Galloway (United States) B Klahn	6	7

Final
4	(Barbados) D King (Canada) P Polansky	6^{4}	6	[8]
2	(United States) R Galloway (United States) B Klahn	7^{7}	4	[10]
