= 2016 Challenger Banque Nationale de Gatineau – Men's singles =

Men's singles
- 2016 Challenger Banque Nationale de Gatineau

Final
- Champion: (Canada) Peter Polansky
- Runner-up: (France) Vincent Millot
- Score: 3–6, 6–4, ret.

Events
Singles	men	women
Doubles	men	women
Challenger de Gatineau	· 2017 →

This was the first edition of the men's singles tournament.

Peter Polansky won the title after Vincent Millot retired before the start of the third set in the final.

== Seeds ==
1. (France) Quentin Halys (first round)
2. (United States) Frances Tiafoe (withdrew)
3. (India) Saketh Myneni (quarterfinals)
4. (Colombia) Alejandro González (first round)
5. (France) Vincent Millot (final, retired)
6. (Croatia) Franko Škugor (first round)
7. (Australia) Andrew Whittington (first round)
8. (Estonia) Jürgen Zopp (first round)

== Draw ==
=== Key ===
- Q = Qualifier
- WC = Wild card
- LL = Lucky loser
- Alt = Alternate
- SE = Special exempt
- PR = Protected ranking
- ITF = ITF entry
- JE = Junior exempt
- w/o = Walkover
- r = Retired
- d = Defaulted
- SR = Special ranking

=== Finals ===
Semifinals
(Canada) Peter Polansky	6	7^{10}
PR	(Croatia) Matija Pecotić	4	6^{8}
5	(France) Vincent Millot	6	6
WC	(Canada) Denis Shapovalov	2	4

Final
(Canada) Peter Polansky	3	6	0
5	(France) Vincent Millot	6	4	0^{r}

=== Top half ===
First round
1	(France) Q Halys	6	4	0
Q	(New Zealand) F Tearney	2	6	6
Q	(Canada) F Auger-Aliassime	2	4
(Canada) P Polansky	6	6
(United Kingdom) E Corrie	6	3	3
(Canada) P Bester	2	6	6
WC	(Canada) F Peliwo	6^{2}	6	7^{7}
7	(Australia) A Whittington	7^{7}	2	6^{0}
4	(Colombia) A González	2	3
PR	(Croatia) M Pecotić	6	6
(France) G Barrère	6^{4}	0
(El Salvador) M Arévalo	7^{7}	6
Q	(Venezuela) LD Martínez	3	4
(Australia) J-P Smith	6	6
(Brazil) G Clezar	3	6	6
6	(Croatia) F Škugor	6	4	3

Second round
Q	(New Zealand) F Tearney	2	3
(Canada) P Polansky	6	6
(Canada) P Bester	6	3	1
WC	(Canada) F Peliwo	2	6	6
PR	(Croatia) M Pecotić	3	7	6
(El Salvador) M Arévalo	6	5	1
(Australia) J-P Smith	6	3	4
(Brazil) G Clezar	4	6	6

Quarterfinals
(Canada) P Polansky	6	6
WC	(Canada) F Peliwo	2	3
PR	(Croatia) M Pecotić	6	6
(Brazil) G Clezar	3	4

Semifinals
(Canada) P Polansky	6	7^{10}
PR	(Croatia) M Pecotić	4	6^{8}

=== Bottom half ===
First round
5	(France) V Millot	6	6
(Japan) H Moriya	3	4
(United Kingdom) B Klein	6	6
(Kazakhstan) A Golubev	2	3
WC	(Canada) A Tabilo	2	0
(Australia) B Mott	6	6
(Australia) L Saville	5	0
3	(India) S Myneni	7	6
8	(Estonia) J Zopp	4	2
(Canada) F Dancevic	6	6
WC	(Canada) B Schnur	1	2
Q	(Australia) G Jones	6	6
LL	(Canada) Pavel Krainik	3	6^{5}
(France) T Lamasine	6	7^{7}
WC	(Canada) D Shapovalov	7	7
LL	(Canada) Samuel Monette	5	5

Second round
5	(France) V Millot	6^{4}	6	6
(United Kingdom) B Klein	7^{7}	1	4
(Australia) B Mott	3	2
3	(India) S Myneni	6	6
(Canada) F Dancevic	6	7
Q	(Australia) G Jones	4	5
(France) T Lamasine	6^{4}	2
WC	(Canada) D Shapovalov	7^{7}	6

Quarterfinals
5	(France) V Millot	7^{7}	6
3	(India) S Myneni	6^{5}	1
(Canada) F Dancevic	1	5
WC	(Canada) D Shapovalov	6	7

Semifinals
5	(France) V Millot	6	6
WC	(Canada) D Shapovalov	2	4
