= 2016 Challenger Banque Nationale de Gatineau – Men's doubles =

Men's doubles
- 2016 Challenger Banque Nationale de Gatineau

Final
- Champion: (France) Tristan Lamasine (Croatia) Franko Škugor
- Runner-up: (Australia) Jarryd Chaplin (Australia) John-Patrick Smith
- Score: 6–3, 6–1

Events
Singles	men	women
Doubles	men	women
Challenger de Gatineau	· 2017 →

This was the first edition of the men's doubles tournament.

Tristan Lamasine and Franko Škugor won the title, defeating Jarryd Chaplin and John-Patrick Smith 6–3, 6–1 in the final.

== Seeds ==
1. (France) Tristan Lamasine / (Croatia) Franko Škugor (champions)
2. (El Salvador) Marcelo Arévalo / (Venezuela) Luis David Martínez (quarterfinals)
3. (Australia) Jarryd Chaplin / (Australia) John-Patrick Smith (final)
4. (Canada) Philip Bester / (Canada) Peter Polansky (first round)

== Draw ==
=== Key ===
- Q = Qualifier
- WC = Wild card
- LL = Lucky loser
- Alt = Alternate
- SE = Special exempt
- PR = Protected ranking
- ITF = ITF entry
- JE = Junior exempt
- w/o = Walkover
- r = Retired
- d = Defaulted
- SR = Special ranking

First round
WC	(Canada) Isade Juneau (Canada) Samuel Monette	6	6
(France) G Barrère (France) V Millot	3	2
4	(Canada) P Bester (Canada) P Polansky	6	4	[8]
(Canada) F Peliwo (Canada) B Schnur	3	6	[10]
(United Kingdom) E Corrie (Republic of Ireland) D O'Hare	3	7	[4]
(India) S Myneni (India) S Singh	6	5	[10]
(Kazakhstan) A Golubev (Estonia) J Zopp	3	6^{2}
(United Kingdom) B Klein (Croatia) M Pecotić	6	7^{7}
(Canada) Pavel Krainik (Canada) A Tabilo	2	2
3	(Australia) Jarryd Chaplin (Australia) J-P Smith	6	6
(Canada) F Auger-Aliassime (Canada) D Shapovalov	6^{4}	6	[7]
(Brazil) G Clezar (Colombia) A González	7^{7}	4	[10]
(Australia) L Saville (Australia) A Whittington	5	6	[4]
2	(El Salvador) M Arévalo (Venezuela) LD Martínez	7	3	[10]

Quarterfinals
1	(France) T Lamasine (Croatia) F Škugor	6	6
WC	(Canada) I Juneau (Canada) S Monette	3	1
(Canada) F Peliwo (Canada) B Schnur	3	4
(India) S Myneni (India) S Singh	6	6
(United Kingdom) B Klein (Croatia) M Pecotić	2	4
3	(Australia) J Chaplin (Australia) J-P Smith	6	6
(Brazil) G Clezar (Colombia) A González	6	6^{4}	[10]
2	(El Salvador) M Arévalo (Venezuela) LD Martínez	4	7^{7}	[7]

Semifinals
1	(France) T Lamasine (Croatia) F Škugor	6	7^{7}
(India) S Myneni (India) S Singh	0	6^{4}
3	(Australia) J Chaplin (Australia) J-P Smith	6	7^{7}
(Brazil) G Clezar (Colombia) A González	2	6^{2}

Final
1	(France) T Lamasine (Croatia) F Škugor	6	6
3	(Australia) J Chaplin (Australia) J-P Smith	3	1
