= 2018 Challenger Banque Nationale de Gatineau – Men's singles =

Men's singles
- 2018 Challenger Banque Nationale de Gatineau

Final
- Champion: (United States) Bradley Klahn
- Runner-up: (France) Ugo Humbert
- Score: 6–3, 7–6^{(7–5)}

Events
Singles	men	women
Doubles	men	women
← 2017 ·	Challenger de Gatineau	· 2019 →

Denis Shapovalov was the defending champion but chose not to defend his title.

Bradley Klahn won the title after defeating Ugo Humbert 6–3, 7–6^{(7–5)} in the final.

== Seeds ==
1. (Canada) Peter Polansky (quarterfinals)
2. (Australia) Jason Kubler (semifinals)
3. (Barbados) Darian King (second round)
4. (Japan) Tatsuma Ito (first round)
5. (United States) Bradley Klahn (champion)
6. (United Kingdom) Liam Broady (first round)
7. (Japan) Go Soeda (semifinals)
8. (Canada) Filip Peliwo (first round)

== Draw ==
=== Key ===
- Q = Qualifier
- WC = Wild card
- LL = Lucky loser
- Alt = Alternate
- SE = Special exempt
- PR = Protected ranking
- ITF = ITF entry
- JE = Junior exempt
- w/o = Walkover
- r = Retired
- d = Defaulted
- SR = Special ranking

=== Finals ===
Semifinals
(France) Ugo Humbert	6	6
7	(Japan) Go Soeda	4	1
5	(United States) Bradley Klahn	6	6
2	(Australia) Jason Kubler	2	3

Final
(France) Ugo Humbert	3	6^{5}
5	(United States) Bradley Klahn	6	7^{7}

=== Top half ===
First round
1	(Canada) P Polansky	7^{7}	6^{7}	7
Q	(Venezuela) R Rodríguez	6^{5}	7^{9}	5
WC	(Canada) Pavel Krainik	4	6	6
WC	(Canada) Samuel Monette	6	4	4
(Canada) B Schnur	3	1
(France) U Humbert	6	6
WC	(Canada) B Sigouin	6	6
6	(United Kingdom) L Broady	4	2
4	(Japan) T Ito	7^{7}	3	5
(Austria) M Neuchrist	6^{2}	6	7
(Japan) Renta Tokuda	6	6^{1}	6
Q	(Israel) E Leshem	4	7^{7}	3
Q	(Australia) Jacob Grills	6	7^{7}
(United States) A Sarkissian	3	6^{3}
(Japan) Y Takahashi	4	3
7	(Japan) G Soeda	6	6

Second round
1	(Canada) P Polansky	6	7
WC	(Canada) P Krainik	2	5
(France) U Humbert	6	6
WC	(Canada) B Sigouin	4	4
(Austria) M Neuchrist	1
(Japan) R Tokuda	1^{r}
Q	(Australia) J Grills	6	1	4
7	(Japan) G Soeda	2	6	6

Quarterfinals
1	(Canada) P Polansky	7^{7}	6^{3}	6^{4}
(France) U Humbert	6^{4}	7^{7}	7^{7}
(Austria) M Neuchrist	6^{3}	3
7	(Japan) G Soeda	7^{7}	6

Semifinals
(France) U Humbert	6	6
7	(Japan) G Soeda	4	1

=== Bottom half ===
First round
5	(United States) B Klahn	7	7^{7}
(Australia) B Mousley	5	6^{3}
Q	(South Korea) Y-s Chung	7^{7}	6
(United States) M Krueger	6^{3}	4
(United Kingdom) A Ward	4	6^{3}
(China) Z Li	6	7^{7}
WC	(Canada) A Galarneau	6^{5}	5
3	(Barbados) D King	7^{7}	7
8	(Canada) F Peliwo	6	4	5
(United States) E Escobedo	3	6	7
(Brazil) J Menezes	6	6
(Austria) L Miedler	3	3
(Lithuania) L Grigelis	6	7
(Italy) S Napolitano	2	5
(Japan) K Uchida	1	2
2	(Australia) J Kubler	6	6

Second round
5	(United States) B Klahn	7	6
Q	(South Korea) Y-s Chung	5	4
(China) Z Li	2	6	6
3	(Barbados) D King	6	4	0
(United States) E Escobedo	6	3	7^{7}
(Brazil) J Menezes	2	6	6^{5}
(Lithuania) L Grigelis	6^{5}	6	4
2	(Australia) J Kubler	7^{7}	4	6

Quarterfinals
5	(United States) B Klahn	6^{7}	6	6
(China) Z Li	7^{9}	4	3
(United States) E Escobedo	6^{4}	7^{7}	3
2	(Australia) J Kubler	7^{7}	6^{3}	6

Semifinals
5	(United States) B Klahn	6	6
2	(Australia) J Kubler	2	3
