= 2019 Challenger Banque Nationale de Gatineau – Men's doubles =

Men's doubles
- 2019 Challenger Banque Nationale de Gatineau

Final
- Champions: (United States) Alex Lawson (Australia) Marc Polmans
- Runners-up: (Mexico) Hans Hach Verdugo (United States) Dennis Novikov
- Score: 6–4, 3–6, [10–7]

Events
Singles	men	women
Doubles	men	women
← 2018 ·	Challenger de Gatineau	· 2020 →

Robert Galloway and Bradley Klahn were the defending champions but chose not to defend their title.

Alex Lawson and Marc Polmans won the title after defeating Hans Hach Verdugo and Dennis Novikov 6–4, 3–6, [10–7] in the final.

== Seeds ==
1. (Venezuela) Roberto Maytín / (United States) Jackson Withrow (semifinals)
2. (United States) Hunter Reese / (Canada) Adil Shamasdin (quarterfinals)
3. (United States) Alex Lawson / (Australia) Marc Polmans (champions)
4. (United States) John Paul Fruttero / (Philippines) Ruben Gonzales (quarterfinals)

== Draw ==
=== Key ===
- Q = Qualifier
- WC = Wild card
- LL = Lucky loser
- Alt = Alternate
- SE = Special exempt
- PR = Protected ranking
- ITF = ITF entry
- JE = Junior exempt
- w/o = Walkover
- r = Retired
- d = Defaulted
- SR = Special ranking

First round
1	(Venezuela) R Maytín (United States) J Withrow	7^{7}	6
(Barbados) D King (Canada) P Polansky	6^{4}	2
PR	(Austria) M Neuchrist (United States) N Pasha	3	6	[10]
WC	(Canada) Sebastien Collard (United States) B Holt	6	0	[12]
3	(United States) A Lawson (Australia) M Polmans	6	6
ITF	(Japan) Shintaro Imai (Portugal) B Saraiva	1	3
(France) E Couacaud (France) G Sakharov	6^{5}	3
(Australia) A Harris (China) Z Li	7^{7}	6
ITF	(United Kingdom) E Hoyt (Tunisia) S Mansouri	6	6
WC	(Canada) A Galarneau (Canada) B Sigouin	3	2
(France) M Janvier (Japan) T Matsui	5	3
4	(United States) JP Fruttero (Philippines) R Gonzales	7	6
(Mexico) H Hach Verdugo (United States) D Novikov	6	6
(Australia) M Banes (Australia) A Santillan	3	4
(Slovakia) N Gombos (Turkey) C İlkel	2	4
2	(United States) H Reese (Canada) A Shamasdin	6	6

Quarterfinals
1	(Venezuela) R Maytín (United States) J Withrow	6	1	[10]
WC	(Canada) S Collard (United States) B Holt	2	6	[3]
3	(United States) A Lawson (Australia) M Polmans	6	7^{7}
(Australia) A Harris (China) Z Li	4	6^{5}
ITF	(United Kingdom) E Hoyt (Tunisia) S Mansouri	7	6
4	(United States) JP Fruttero (Philippines) R Gonzales	5	0
(Mexico) H Hach Verdugo (United States) D Novikov	3	6	[10]
2	(United States) H Reese (Canada) A Shamasdin	6	4	[7]

Semifinals
1	(Venezuela) R Maytín (United States) J Withrow	2	6^{3}
3	(United States) A Lawson (Australia) M Polmans	6	7^{7}
ITF	(United Kingdom) E Hoyt (Tunisia) S Mansouri	6^{4}	3
(Mexico) H Hach Verdugo (United States) D Novikov	7^{7}	6

Final
3	(United States) A Lawson (Australia) M Polmans	6	3	[10]
(Mexico) H Hach Verdugo (United States) D Novikov	4	6	[7]
