= 2016 Challenger Banque Nationale de Gatineau – Women's doubles =

Women's doubles
- 2016 Challenger Banque Nationale de Gatineau

Final
- Champions: (Canada) Bianca Andreescu (Canada) Charlotte Robillard-Millette
- Runners-up: (Japan) Mana Ayukawa (United Kingdom) Samantha Murray
- Score: 4–6, 6–4, [10–6]

Events
Singles	men	women
Doubles	men	women
- Challenger de Gatineau

Jessica Moore and Carol Zhao were the defending champions, but Moore decided not to participate this year. Zhao partnered with Erin Routliffe, but lost in the semifinals to Mana Ayukawa and Samantha Murray.

Bianca Andreescu and Charlotte Robillard-Millette won the title, defeating Mana Ayukawa and Samantha Murray 4–6, 6–4, [10–6] in the final.

== Seeds ==
1. (United States) Jacqueline Cako / (United States) Danielle Lao (quarterfinals, withdrew)
2. (United Kingdom) Katy Dunne / (Czech Republic) Barbora Štefková (semifinals)
3. (United States) Dasha Ivanova / (Mexico) Victoria Rodríguez (first round)
4. (Japan) Mana Ayukawa / (United Kingdom) Samantha Murray (final)

== Draw ==
Key

- Q = Qualifier
- WC = Wild card
- LL = Lucky loser
- Alt = Alternate
- ITF = ITF entry
- PR = Protected ranking
- SR = Special ranking
- SE = Special exempt
- JE = Junior exempt
- JR = Junior Accelerator Programme entrant
- CO = College Accelerator Programme entrant
- NG = Next Gen Accelerator Program entrant
- w/o = Walkover
- r = Retired
- d = Defaulted

First round
1	(United States) J Cako (United States) D Lao	6	6
(Canada) I Boulais (United States) J Failla	4	4
(Canada) E Routliffe (Canada) C Zhao	6	6
(Canada) N Bunea (Canada) I Milosevic	1	2
4	(Japan) M Ayukawa (United Kingdom) S Murray	6	6
(Canada) M Auger-Aliassime (Canada) T Lagarde	1	3
(United States) T Dean (Canada) AS Manolescu	0	0
(United States) F Di Lorenzo (United States) E Halbauer	6	6
(Canada) S Dynka (United States) K Smith	2	3
(Canada) B Andreescu (Canada) C Robillard-Millette	6	6
(Australia) L Cabrera (United States) J Wacnik	7	7^{8}
3	(United States) D Ivanova (Mexico) V Rodríguez	5	6^{6}
(Canada) A-S Courteau (Canada) C Leduc	0	5
(Canada) L Kwong (Canada) C Petrick	6	7
(Canada) P Januskova (Canada) A Wozniak	1	6	[11]
2	(United Kingdom) K Dunne (Czech Republic) B Štefková	6	4	[13]

Quarterfinals
1	(United States) J Cako (United States) D Lao
(Canada) E Routliffe (Canada) C Zhao	w/o
4	(Japan) M Ayukawa (United Kingdom) S Murray	6^{4}	7^{7}	[10]
(United States) F Di Lorenzo (United States) E Halbauer	7^{7}	6^{3}	[8]
(Canada) B Andreescu (Canada) C Robillard-Millette	6	6
(Australia) L Cabrera (United States) J Wacnik	4	4
(Canada) L Kwong (Canada) C Petrick	1	2
2	(United Kingdom) K Dunne (Czech Republic) B Štefková	6	6

Semifinals
(Canada) E Routliffe (Canada) C Zhao	5	0
4	(Japan) M Ayukawa (United Kingdom) S Murray	7	6
(Canada) B Andreescu (Canada) C Robillard-Millette	6	6^{7}	[10]
2	(United Kingdom) K Dunne (Czech Republic) B Štefková	3	7^{9}	[7]

Final
4	(Japan) M Ayukawa (United Kingdom) S Murray	6	4	[6]
(Canada) B Andreescu (Canada) C Robillard-Millette	4	6	[10]
