= 2017 Challenger Banque Nationale de Gatineau – Women's doubles =

Women's doubles
- 2017 Challenger Banque Nationale de Gatineau

Final
- Champions: (Japan) Hiroko Kuwata (Russia) Valeria Savinykh
- Runners-up: (Australia) Kimberly Birrell (United Kingdom) Emily Webley-Smith
- Score: 4–6, 6–3, [10–5]

Events
Singles	men	women
Doubles	men	women
- Challenger de Gatineau

Bianca Andreescu and Charlotte Robillard-Millette were the defending champions, but decided not to participate this year.

Hiroko Kuwata and Valeria Savinykh won the title, defeating Kimberly Birrell and Emily Webley-Smith 4–6, 6–3, [10–5] in the final.

== Seeds ==
1. (Japan) Hiroko Kuwata / (Russia) Valeria Savinykh (champions)
2. (Australia) Priscilla Hon / (Australia) Ellen Perez (quarterfinals)
3. (Chile) Alexa Guarachi / (United States) Danielle Lao (quarterfinals)
4. (United States) Madeleine Kobelt / (Australia) Olivia Tjandramulia (first round)

== Draw ==
Key

- Q = Qualifier
- WC = Wild card
- LL = Lucky loser
- Alt = Alternate
- ITF = ITF entry
- PR = Protected ranking
- SR = Special ranking
- SE = Special exempt
- JE = Junior exempt
- JR = Junior Accelerator Programme entrant
- CO = College Accelerator Programme entrant
- NG = Next Gen Accelerator Program entrant
- w/o = Walkover
- r = Retired
- d = Defaulted

First round
1	(Japan) H Kuwata (Russia) V Savinykh	5	7^{7}	[10]
(Canada) P Januskova (France) J Ponchet	7	6^{5}	[7]
(United States) S Talcott (Mexico) M Zacarías	6	6
WC	(Canada) C Leduc (Canada) I Milosevic	2	0
4	(United States) M Kobelt (Australia) O Tjandramulia	1	3
(Japan) M Hibi (Japan) M Minokoshi	6	6
(Germany) S-R Sekulic (United States) C Van Nguyen	6	6^{3}	[1]
WC	(Canada) I Boulais (Canada) A Vagramov	4	7^{7}	[10]
(Australia) K Birrell (United Kingdom) E Webley-Smith	6	6
Alt	(United States) N Coopersmith (Russia) N Kukharchuk	3	1
WC	(Canada) A Craciun (Canada) L Sleeth	5	3
3	(Chile) A Guarachi (United States) D Lao	7	6
(United States) J Elbaba (Japan) M Imanishi	6	1	[5]
(United Kingdom) S Murray (United Kingdom) K Swan	3	6	[10]
(Italy) C Ferrando (Australia) O Rogowska	7^{7}	1	[3]
2	(Australia) P Hon (Australia) E Perez	6^{4}	6	[10]

Quarterfinals
1	(Japan) H Kuwata (Russia) V Savinykh	3
(United States) S Talcott (Mexico) M Zacarías	0^{r}
(Japan) M Hibi (Japan) M Minokoshi	6	7
WC	(Canada) I Boulais (Canada) A Vagramov	4	5
(Australia) K Birrell (United Kingdom) E Webley-Smith	2	7^{10}	[14]
3	(Chile) A Guarachi (United States) D Lao	6	6^{8}	[12]
(United Kingdom) S Murray (United Kingdom) K Swan	6	6
2	(Australia) P Hon (Australia) E Perez	3	4

Semifinals
1	(Japan) H Kuwata (Russia) V Savinykh	7^{7}	7
(Japan) M Hibi (Japan) M Minokoshi	6^{4}	5
(Australia) K Birrell (United Kingdom) E Webley-Smith	7	1
(United Kingdom) S Murray (United Kingdom) K Swan	5	0^{r}

Final
1	(Japan) H Kuwata (Russia) V Savinykh	4	6	[10]
(Australia) K Birrell (United Kingdom) E Webley-Smith	6	3	[5]
