= 2016 Challenger Banque Nationale de Gatineau – Women's singles =

Women's singles
- 2016 Challenger Banque Nationale de Gatineau

Final
- Champion: (Canada) Bianca Andreescu
- Runner-up: (United States) Ellie Halbauer
- Score: 6–2, 7–5

Events
Singles	men	women
Doubles	men	women
← 2015 ·	Challenger de Gatineau	· 2017 →

Alexa Glatch was the defending champion, but decided not to participate this year.

Bianca Andreescu won the title, defeating Ellie Halbauer 6–2, 7–5 in the final.

== Seeds ==
1. (United States) Jennifer Brady (withdrew)
2. (Czech Republic) Barbora Štefková (quarterfinals)
3. (Canada) Françoise Abanda (first round)
4. (United States) Lauren Albanese (quarterfinals)
5. (Mexico) Victoria Rodríguez (first round)
6. (United Kingdom) Katy Dunne (second round)
7. (United States) Bernarda Pera (first round)
8. (United States) Francesca Di Lorenzo (first round)

== Draw ==
=== Key ===
- Q = Qualifier
- WC = Wild card
- LL = Lucky loser
- Alt = Alternate
- ITF = ITF entry
- PR = Protected ranking
- SR = Special ranking
- SE = Special exempt
- JE = Junior exempt
- JR = Junior Accelerator Programme entrant
- CO = College Accelerator Programme entrant
- NG = Next Gen Accelerator Program entrant
- w/o = Walkover
- r = Retired
- d = Defaulted

=== Finals ===
Semifinals
Q	(Australia) Lizette Cabrera	4	6	3
(United States) Ellie Halbauer	6	1	6
WC	(Canada) Bianca Andreescu	2	6	6
(Italy) Cristiana Ferrando	6	4	1

Final
(United States) Ellie Halbauer	2	5
WC	(Canada) Bianca Andreescu	6	7

=== Top half ===
First round
LL	(Canada) A-S Courteau	2	2
Q	(Australia) L Cabrera	6	6
(United States) D Lao	6	6
WC	(Canada) P Januskova	4	3
Q	(United States) J Failla	5	1
(Japan) M Imanishi	7	6
(Australia) O Rogowska	1	6	6
8	(United States) F Di Lorenzo	6	0	3
3	(Canada) F Abanda	4	6^{2}
(United States) J Cako	6	7^{7}
(United Kingdom) S Murray	5	2
Q	(United States) D Ivanova	7	6
(United States) E Halbauer	6	6
(Canada) A Wozniak	1	3
(Canada) C Zhao	3	6	6
7	(United States) B Pera	6	3	3

Second round
Q	(Australia) L Cabrera	4	6	3
(United States) D Lao	6	4	0^{r}
(Japan) M Imanishi	2	3
(Australia) O Rogowska	6	6
(United States) J Cako	6	6
Q	(United States) D Ivanova	0	2
(United States) E Halbauer	6	6
(Canada) C Zhao	2	1

Quarterfinals
Q	(Australia) L Cabrera	5	7^{7}	6
(Australia) O Rogowska	7	6^{5}	4
(United States) J Cako	3	3
(United States) E Halbauer	6	6

Semifinals
Q	(Australia) L Cabrera	4	6	3
(United States) E Halbauer	6	1	6

=== Bottom half ===
First round
5	(Mexico) V Rodríguez	3	2
(United States) T Kinard	6	6
WC	(Canada) B Andreescu	3	7	6
Q	(Russia) N Kukharchuk	6	5	1
(United States) J Wacnik	7	6
WC	(Canada) V Wong	5	4
Q	(United States) A Morozova	6	3	6^{4}
4	(United States) L Albanese	3	6	7^{7}
6	(United Kingdom) K Dunne	7^{7}	4	7
WC	(Canada) E Routliffe	6^{3}	6	5
(Japan) M Ayukawa	2	0
(Italy) C Ferrando	6	6
Q	(Canada) C Robillard-Millette	6^{5}	5
Q	(Canada) I Boulais	7^{7}	7
Q	(United States) K Smith	4	0
2	(Czech Republic) B Štefková	6	6

Second round
(United States) T Kinard	2	1
WC	(Canada) B Andreescu	6	6
(United States) J Wacnik	2	1
4	(United States) L Albanese	6	6
6	(United Kingdom) K Dunne	6	3	2
(Italy) C Ferrando	3	6	6
Q	(Canada) I Boulais	2	2
2	(Czech Republic) B Štefková	6	6

Quarterfinals
WC	(Canada) B Andreescu	6	6
4	(United States) L Albanese	2	3
(Italy) C Ferrando	2	6	6
2	(Czech Republic) B Štefková	6	3	4

Semifinals
WC	(Canada) B Andreescu	2	6	6
(Italy) C Ferrando	6	4	1
