= 2022 Open de Oeiras III – Doubles =

Doubles
- 2022 Open de Oeiras III

Final
- Champions: (France) Sadio Doumbia (France) Fabien Reboul
- Runners-up: (United States) Robert Galloway (United States) Alex Lawson
- Score: 6–3, 3–6, [15–13]

Events
Singles	Doubles
- Open de Oeiras

Nuno Borges and Francisco Cabral were the two-time defending champions but only Cabral chose to defend his title, partnering João Domingues. Cabral lost in the quarterfinals to Sadio Doumbia and Fabien Reboul.

Doumbia and Reboul won the title after defeating Robert Galloway and Alex Lawson 6–3, 3–6, [15–13] in the final.

== Seeds ==
1. (France) Sadio Doumbia / (France) Fabien Reboul (champions)
2. (United States) Robert Galloway / (United States) Alex Lawson (final)
3. (United States) Evan King / (Venezuela) Luis David Martínez (quarterfinals)
4. (United States) James Cerretani / (India) Arjun Kadhe (quarterfinals)

== Draw ==
Key

- Q = Qualifier
- WC = Wild card
- LL = Lucky loser
- Alt = Alternate
- ITF = ITF entry
- PR = Protected ranking
- SR = Special ranking
- SE = Special exempt
- JE = Junior exempt
- JR = Junior Accelerator Programme entrant
- CO = College Accelerator Programme entrant
- NG = Next Gen Accelerator Program entrant
- w/o = Walkover
- r = Retired
- d = Defaulted

First round
1	(France) S Doumbia (France) F Reboul	7	3	[10]
(Philippines) R Gonzales (United States) R Stalder	5	6	[8]
Alt	(Brazil) P Boscardin Dias (Brazil) Oscar José Gutierrez	3	4
(Portugal) F Cabral (Portugal) J Domingues	6	6
4	(United States) J Cerretani (India) A Kadhe	3	7^{7}	[10]
(Belgium) M Geerts (Netherlands) B Stevens	6	6^{5}	[2]
(Portugal) G Oliveira (Japan) K Uchida	5	2
(Uzbekistan) S Fayziev; E Karlovskiy	7	6
(Bolivia) B Arias (Bolivia) F Zeballos	6^{4}	6^{2}
(Peru) S Galdós (Switzerland) L Margaroli	7^{7}	7^{7}
WC	(Portugal) Pedro Araújo (Portugal) T Torres	6	2	[9]
3	(United States) E King (Venezuela) LD Martínez	2	6	[11]
(Brazil) D Dutra da Silva (Switzerland) J Nikles	6	6^{4}	[10]
(Belgium) K Coppejans (Spain) O Roca Batalla	2	7^{7}	[8]
WC	(Portugal) J Faria (Portugal) H Rocha	5	3
2	(United States) R Galloway (United States) A Lawson	7	6

Quarterfinals
1	(France) S Doumbia (France) F Reboul	6	2	[10]
(Portugal) F Cabral (Portugal) J Domingues	1	6	[6]
4	(United States) J Cerretani (India) A Kadhe	3	6	[5]
(Uzbekistan) S Fayziev; E Karlovskiy	6	2	[10]
(Peru) S Galdós (Switzerland) L Margaroli	6	6
3	(United States) E King (Venezuela) LD Martínez	4	4
(Brazil) D Dutra da Silva (Switzerland) J Nikles	2	3
2	(United States) R Galloway (United States) A Lawson	6	6

Semifinals
1	(France) S Doumbia (France) F Reboul	6	7
(Uzbekistan) S Fayziev; E Karlovskiy	3	5
(Peru) S Galdós (Switzerland) L Margaroli	3	4
2	(United States) R Galloway (United States) A Lawson	6	6

Final
1	(France) S Doumbia (France) F Reboul	6	3	[15]
2	(United States) R Galloway (United States) A Lawson	3	6	[13]
