= 2017 Challenger Banque Nationale de Gatineau =

- Date: July 17–23
- Edition: 2nd (men); 4th (women)
- Category: ATP Challenger Tour; ITF Women's Circuit
- Prize money: US$75,000 (men); US$25,000 (women)
- Surface: Hard – outdoors
- Location: Gatineau, Canada
- Venue: Parc de l'Île

Champions

Men's singles
- (Canada) Denis Shapovalov

Women's singles
- (Canada) Aleksandra Wozniak

Men's doubles
- (United States) Bradley Klahn / (United States) Jackson Withrow

Women's doubles
- (Japan) Hiroko Kuwata / (Russia) Valeria Savinykh
- Challenger de Gatineau

The 2017 Challenger Banque Nationale de Gatineau was a professional tennis tournament played on outdoor hard courts. It was the 2nd edition of the tournament for men and the 4th for women, and it was part of the 2017 ATP Challenger Tour and the 2017 ITF Women's Circuit, offering totals of $75,000 for men and $25,000 for women in prize money. It took place in Gatineau, Canada between July 17 and 23, 2017.

== Men's singles main-draw entrants ==
=== Seeds ===
Country	Player	Rank^{1}	Seed
TUN	Malek Jaziri	77	1
ITA	Thomas Fabbiano	91	2
SLO	Blaž Kavčič	110	3
JPN	Go Soeda	113	4
CAN	Peter Polansky	127	5
TPE	Jason Jung	160	6
CAN	Denis Shapovalov	164	7
FRA	Vincent Millot	171	8

- ^{1} Rankings are as of July 3, 2017

=== Other entrants ===
The following players received wildcards into the singles main draw:

- (Canada) Philip Bester
- (United Kingdom) Liam Broady
- (Canada) Filip Peliwo
- (Canada) Benjamin Sigouin

The following player received entry into the singles main draw using a protected ranking:

- (United States) Bradley Klahn

The following players received entry into the singles main draw as alternates:

- (United States) Daniel Nguyen
- (Australia) Max Purcell

The following players received entry from the qualifying draw:

- (United States) JC Aragone
- (United States) Sekou Bangoura
- (United States) Marcos Giron
- (Denmark) Mikael Torpegaard

== Women's singles main-draw entrants ==
=== Seeds ===
Country	Player	Rank^{1}	Seed
AUS	Olivia Rogowska	237	1
USA	Danielle Lao	241	2
JPN	Mayo Hibi	250	3
JPN	Hiroko Kuwata	256	4
POR	Michelle Larcher de Brito	283	5
CAN	Aleksandra Wozniak	322	6
GER	Sarah-Rebecca Sekulic	324	7
JPN	Miharu Imanishi	330	8

- ^{1} Rankings are as of July 3, 2017

=== Other entrants ===
The following players received wildcards into the singles main draw:

- (Canada) Carson Branstine
- (Canada) Anca Craciun
- (Canada) Leylah Annie Fernandez
- (Canada) Layne Sleeth

The following player entered the singles main draw with a protected ranking:

- (Australia) Kimberly Birrell

The following players received entry from the qualifying draw:

- (Russia) Elena Bovina
- (Chile) Alexa Guarachi
- (Russia) Nika Kukharchuk
- (United Kingdom) Samantha Murray
- (Australia) Ellen Perez
- (United Kingdom) Emily Webley-Smith
- (Mexico) Marcela Zacarías
- (United States) Amy Zhu

== Champions ==
=== Men's singles ===
- (Canada) Denis Shapovalov def. (Canada) Peter Polansky, 6–1, 3–6, 6–3

=== Women's singles ===
- (Canada) Aleksandra Wozniak def. (Australia) Ellen Perez, 7–6^{(7–4)}, 6–4

=== Men's doubles ===
- (United States) Bradley Klahn / (United States) Jackson Withrow def. (Mexico) Hans Hach Verdugo / (France) Vincent Millot, 6–2, 6–3

=== Women's doubles ===
- (Japan) Hiroko Kuwata / (Russia) Valeria Savinykh def. (Australia) Kimberly Birrell / (United Kingdom) Emily Webley-Smith, 4–6, 6–3, [10–5]
