= 2021 Open Castilla y León =

2021 ATP Challenger Tour

- Date: 26 July – 1 August
- Edition: 35th
- Surface: Hard
- Location: Segovia, Spain

Champions

Singles
- (France) Benjamin Bonzi

Doubles
- (United States) Robert Galloway / (United States) Alex Lawson
- Open Castilla y León

The 2021 Open Castilla y León Villa de El Espinar was a professional tennis tournament played on outdoor hard courts. It was the 35th edition of the tournament and part of the 2021 ATP Challenger Tour. It took place in El Espinar, Segovia, Spain, between 26 July – 1 August 2021.

== Singles main draw entrants ==
=== Seeds ===
Country	Player	Rank^{1}	Seed
ESP	Feliciano López	89	1
FRA	Benjamin Bonzi	111	2
~~FRA~~	~~Grégoire Barrère~~	~~135~~	~~3~~
SUI	Marc-Andrea Hüsler	162	4
POR	Frederico Ferreira Silva	174	5
FRA	Quentin Halys	181	6
FRA	Mathias Bourgue	201	7
TUR	Altuğ Çelikbilek	203	8
TUR	Cem İlkel	209	9

- ^{1} Rankings as of 19 July 2021.

=== Other entrants ===
The following players received wildcards into the singles main draw:

- (Spain) Julio César Porras
- (Spain) Alejandro Moro Cañas
- (Spain) Nikolás Sánchez Izquierdo

The following players received entry into the singles main draw as alternates:

- (Bulgaria) Adrian Andreev
- (Germany) Johannes Härteis
- (Romania) Filip Jianu

The following players received entry from the qualifying draw:

- (Spain) Carlos Gimeno Valero
- (United States) Nicolas Moreno de Alboran
- (Czech Republic) Dalibor Svrčina
- (Italy) Luca Vanni

== Champions ==
=== Singles ===
- (France) Benjamin Bonzi def. (Netherlands) Tim van Rijthoven 7–6^{(12–10)}, 3–6, 6–4.

=== Doubles ===
- (United States) Robert Galloway / (United States) Alex Lawson def. (United States) JC Aragone / (Colombia) Nicolás Barrientos 7–6^{(10–8)}, 6–4.
