= 2017 Challenger Banque Nationale de Gatineau – Women's singles =

Women's singles
- 2017 Challenger Banque Nationale de Gatineau

Final
- Champion: (Canada) Aleksandra Wozniak
- Runner-up: (Australia) Ellen Perez
- Score: 7–6^{(7–4)}, 6–4

Events
Singles	men	women
Doubles	men	women
← 2016 ·	Challenger de Gatineau	· 2018 →

Bianca Andreescu was the defending champion, but decided not to participate this year.

Aleksandra Wozniak won the title, defeating Ellen Perez 7–6^{(7–4)}, 6–4 in the final.

== Seeds ==
1. (Australia) Olivia Rogowska (second round)
2. (United States) Danielle Lao (second round)
3. (Japan) Mayo Hibi (quarterfinals)
4. (Japan) Hiroko Kuwata (second round)
5. (Portugal) Michelle Larcher de Brito (first round)
6. (Canada) Aleksandra Wozniak (champion)
7. (Germany) Sarah-Rebecca Sekulic (semifinals)
8. (Japan) Miharu Imanishi (first round)

== Draw ==
=== Key ===
- Q = Qualifier
- WC = Wild card
- LL = Lucky loser
- Alt = Alternate
- SE = Special exempt
- PR = Protected ranking
- ITF = ITF entry
- JE = Junior exempt
- w/o = Walkover
- r = Retired
- d = Defaulted
- SR = Special ranking

=== Finals ===
Semifinals
7	(Germany) Sarah-Rebecca Sekulic	4	4
Q	(Australia) Ellen Perez	6	6
6	(Canada) Aleksandra Wozniak	6	6
(Australia) P Hon	2	2

Final
Q	(Australia) Ellen Perez	6^{4}	4
6	(Canada) Aleksandra Wozniak	7^{7}	6

=== Top half ===
First round
1	(Australia) O Rogowska	6	6
Q	(United States) A Zhu	2	4
WC	(Canada) L Sleeth	4	5
Q	(United Kingdom) S Murray	6	7
WC	(Canada) C Branstine	6	6
WC	(Canada) A Craciun	2	2
(Russia) V Savinykh	2	1
7	(Germany) S-R Sekulic	6	6
4	(Japan) H Kuwata	1	6	6
(Japan) M Minokoshi	6	4	1
Q	(Chile) A Guarachi	6	6
(United States) J Elbaba	0	2
Q	(Russia) N Kukharchuk	0	1
(Italy) C Ferrando	6	6
Q	(Australia) E Perez	6	6
5	(Portugal) M Larcher de Brito	3	4

Second round
1	(Australia) O Rogowska	6^{6}	7	4
Q	(United Kingdom) S Murray	7^{8}	5	6
WC	(Canada) C Branstine	6^{3}	6	4
7	(Germany) S-R Sekulic	7^{7}	3	6
4	(Japan) H Kuwata	6	3	6^{2}
Q	(Chile) A Guarachi	4	6	7^{7}
(Italy) C Ferrando	5	4
Q	(Australia) E Perez	7	6

Quarterfinals
Q	(United Kingdom) S Murray	0	4
7	(Germany) S-R Sekulic	6	6
Q	(Chile) A Guarachi	6^{4}	2
Q	(Australia) E Perez	7^{7}	6

Semifinals
7	(Germany) S-R Sekulic	4	4
Q	(Australia) E Perez	6	6

=== Bottom half ===
First round
6	(Canada) A Wozniak	7^{7}	6
(United Kingdom) K Swan	6^{5}	1
(Slovakia) Z Zlochová	1	4
Q	(Russia) E Bovina	6	6
(France) J Ponchet	6	6
WC	(Canada) LA Fernandez	1	2
PR	(Australia) K Birrell	1	2
3	(Japan) M Hibi	6	6
8	(Japan) M Imanishi	2	3
(United States) R Yurovsky	6	6
(Australia) P Hon	4	6	6
(Canada) C Zhao	6	4	4
Q	(United Kingdom) E Webley-Smith	1	0
Q	(Mexico) M Zacarías	6	6
(Australia) O Tjandramulia	2	0
2	(United States) D Lao	6	6

Second round
6	(Canada) A Wozniak	6	6
Q	(Russia) E Bovina	1	2
(France) J Ponchet	4	6	5
3	(Japan) M Hibi	6	2	7
(United States) R Yurovsky
(Australia) P Hon	w/o
Q	(Mexico) M Zacarías	3	6	6
2	(United States) D Lao	6	3	3

Quarterfinals
6	(Canada) A Wozniak	6	7^{7}
3	(Japan) M Hibi	4	6^{5}
(Australia) P Hon	6	6
Q	(Mexico) M Zacarías	1	3

Semifinals
6	(Canada) A Wozniak	6	6
(Australia) P Hon	2	2
