= 2021 Open Castilla y León – Singles =

Tennis Tournament

Singles
- 2021 Open Castilla y León

Final
- Champion: (France) Benjamin Bonzi
- Runner-up: (Netherlands) Tim van Rijthoven
- Score: 7–6^{(12–10)}, 3–6, 6–4

Events
| Singles | Doubles |
- Open Castilla y León

Nicola Kuhn was the defending champion but chose not to defend his title.

Benjamin Bonzi won the title after defeating Tim van Rijthoven 7–6^{(12–10)}, 3–6, 6–4 in the final.

== Seeds ==
1. (Spain) Feliciano López (quarterfinals)
2. (France) Benjamin Bonzi (champion)
3. (France) Grégoire Barrère (withdrew)
4. (Switzerland) Marc-Andrea Hüsler (first round)
5. (Portugal) Frederico Ferreira Silva (first round, retired)
6. (France) Quentin Halys (first round)
7. (France) Mathias Bourgue (quarterfinals)
8. (Turkey) Altuğ Çelikbilek (quarterfinals)
9. (Turkey) Cem İlkel (second round)

== Draw ==
Key

- Q = Qualifier
- WC = Wild card
- LL = Lucky loser
- Alt = Alternate
- ITF = ITF entry
- PR = Protected ranking
- SR = Special ranking
- SE = Special exempt
- JE = Junior exempt
- JR = Junior Accelerator Programme entrant
- CO = College Accelerator Programme entrant
- NG = Next Gen Accelerator Program entrant
- w/o = Walkover
- r = Retired
- d = Defaulted

=== Finals ===
Semifinals
(France) Hugo Grenier | 6^{7} | 2
(Netherlands) Tim van Rijthoven | 7^{9} | 6
Q | (United States) Nicolas Moreno de Alboran | 3 | 6 | 2
2 | (France) Benjamin Bonzi | 6 | 4 | 6

Final
(Netherlands) Tim van Rijthoven | 6^{10} | 6 | 4
2 | (France) Benjamin Bonzi | 7^{12} | 3 | 6

=== Top half ===
First round
1 | (Spain) F López | 6 | 7^{7}
WC | (Spain) N Sánchez Izquierdo | 4 | 6^{2}
WC | (Spain) Julio César Porras | 7^{8} | 6
(Japan) H Moriya | 6^{6} | 2
(France) H Grenier | 6 | 6
(Russia) P Kotov | 4 | 2
Q | (Spain) C Gimeno Valero | 6 | 7^{7}
6 | (France) Q Halys | 3 | 6^{3}
4 | (Switzerland) M-A Hüsler | 7^{8} | 6^{4} | 5
(Netherlands) T van Rijthoven | 6^{6} | 7^{7} | 7
(Tunisia) M Jaziri | 6^{5} | 6 | 6
(United States) JC Aragone | 7^{7} | 2 | 1
WC | (Spain) A Moro Cañas | 3 | 7^{8} | 6
(Portugal) G Oliveira | 6 | 6^{6} | 1
Alt | (Romania) FC Jianu | 3 | 4
7 | (France) M Bourgue | 6 | 6

Second round
1 | (Spain) F López | 6^{3} | 6 | 6
WC | (Spain) J César Porras | 7^{7} | 2 | 4
(France) H Grenier | 3 | 6 | 6
Q | (Spain) C Gimeno Valero | 6 | 3 | 2
(Netherlands) T van Rijthoven | 4 | 6 | 6
(Tunisia) M Jaziri | 6 | 3 | 3
WC | (Spain) A Moro Cañas | 4 | 2
7 | (France) M Bourgue | 6 | 6

Quarterfinals
1 | (Spain) F López | 6^{6} | 1
(France) H Grenier | 7^{8} | 6
(Netherlands) T van Rijthoven | 6 | 7^{7}
7 | (France) M Bourgue | 4 | 6^{3}

Semifinals
(France) H Grenier | 6^{7} | 2
(Netherlands) T van Rijthoven | 7^{9} | 6

=== Bottom half ===
First round
8 | (Turkey) A Çelikbilek | 6 | 6
Alt | (Germany) J Härteis | 3 | 4
(Netherlands) I Sijsling | 1 | 3
(Russia) T Gabashvili | 6 | 6
Q | (Italy) L Vanni | 4 | 3
Q | (United States) N Moreno de Alboran | 6 | 6
(Spain) R Ortega Olmedo | 6 | 6^{4} | 4
9 | (Turkey) C İlkel | 3 | 7^{7} | 6
5 | (Portugal) F Ferreira Silva | 4 | 0^{r}
Q | (Czech Republic) D Svrčina | 6 | 0
(Argentina) R Olivo | 7 | 6
(Spain) A Menéndez Maceiras | 5 | 2
(Bosnia and Herzegovina) M Bašić | 4 | 1
(Italy) M Viola | 6 | 6
Alt | (Bulgaria) A Andreev | 7^{7} | 4 | 6^{3}
2 | (France) B Bonzi | 6^{2} | 6 | 7^{7}

Second round
8 | (Turkey) A Çelikbilek | 6 | 3 | 6
(Russia) T Gabashvili | 3 | 6 | 3
Q | (United States) N Moreno de Alboran | 6 | 6
9 | (Turkey) C İlkel | 4 | 0
Q | (Czech Republic) D Svrčina | 6 | 3 | 6
(Argentina) R Olivo | 4 | 6 | 4
(Italy) M Viola | 1 | 2
2 | (France) B Bonzi | 6 | 6

Quarterfinals
8 | (Turkey) A Çelikbilek | 4 | 2
Q | (United States) N Moreno de Alboran | 6 | 6
Q | (Czech Republic) D Svrčina | 3 | 4
2 | (France) B Bonzi | 6 | 6

Semifinals
Q | (United States) N Moreno de Alboran | 3 | 6 | 2
2 | (France) B Bonzi | 6 | 4 | 6
