= 2019 Challenger Banque Nationale de Gatineau – Men's singles =

Men's singles
- 2019 Challenger Banque Nationale de Gatineau

Final
- Champion: (Australia) Jason Kubler
- Runner-up: (France) Enzo Couacaud
- Score: 6–4, 6–4

Events
| Singles | men | women |
| Doubles | men | women |
| ← 2018 · | Challenger de Gatineau | · 2020 → |

Bradley Klahn was the defending champion but chose not to defend his title.

Jason Kubler won the title after defeating Enzo Couacaud 6–4, 6–4 in the final.

== Seeds ==
All seeds receive a bye into the second round.

1. (France) Antoine Hoang (second round)
2. (South Korea) Kwon Soon-woo (third round)
3. (Canada) Peter Polansky (third round)
4. (United States) Michael Mmoh (third round)
5. (Israel) Dudi Sela (third round)
6. (Slovakia) Norbert Gombos (quarterfinals)
7. (Denmark) Mikael Torpegaard (second round)
8. (Japan) Yasutaka Uchiyama (third round)
9. (Canada) Vasek Pospisil (withdrew)
10. (Australia) Jason Kubler (champion)
11. (Australia) Marc Polmans (quarterfinals)
12. (Barbados) Darian King (semifinals)
13. (France) Maxime Janvier (quarterfinals)
14. (Australia) Thanasi Kokkinakis (withdrew)
15. (France) Enzo Couacaud (final)
16. (South Korea) Lee Duck-hee (quarterfinals)

== Draw ==
=== Key ===
- Q = Qualifier
- WC = Wild card
- LL = Lucky loser
- Alt = Alternate
- SE = Special exempt
- PR = Protected ranking
- ITF = ITF entry
- JE = Junior exempt
- w/o = Walkover
- r = Retired
- d = Defaulted
- SR = Special ranking

=== Finals ===
Quarterfinals
16 | (South Korea) Lee Duck-hee | 2 | 3
10 | (Australia) Jason Kubler | 6 | 6
(Brazil) João Menezes | 4 | 7 | 7
6 | (Slovakia) Norbert Gombos | 6 | 5 | 5
12 | (Barbados) Darian King | 6 | 1 | 6
13 | (France) Maxime Janvier | 3 | 6 | 1
11 | (Australia) Marc Polmans | 1 | 4
15 | (France) Enzo Couacaud | 6 | 6

Semifinals
10 | (Australia) Jason Kubler | 6 | 6
(Brazil) João Menezes | 3 | 1
12 | (Barbados) Darian King | 2 | 4
15 | (France) Enzo Couacaud | 6 | 6

Final
10 | (Australia) Jason Kubler | 6 | 6
15 | (France) Enzo Couacaud | 4 | 4

=== Top half ===
==== Section 1 ====
First round
WC | (Canada) A Galarneau | 7 | 2 | 6
(Chile) MT Barrios Vera | 5 | 6 | 3
(United States) E Escobedo | 6 | 6
(United States) A Sarkissian | 1 | 3
ITF | (United Kingdom) E Hoyt | 1 | 4
(Japan) H Moriya | 6 | 6
(United States) Mi Redlicki | 6 | 4 | 7
(Serbia) D Petrović | 3 | 6 | 5

Second round
1 | (France) A Hoang | 3 | 6 | 6^{4}
WC | (Canada) A Galarneau | 6 | 3 | 7^{7}
(United States) E Escobedo | 4 | 6 | 6^{4}
16 | (South Korea) D-h Lee | 6 | 4 | 7^{7}
10 | (Australia) J Kubler | 6 | 6
(Japan) H Moriya | 2 | 2
(United States) Mi Redlicki | 2 | 1
5 | (Israel) D Sela | 6 | 6

Third round
WC | (Canada) A Galarneau | 3 | 5
16 | (South Korea) D-h Lee | 6 | 7
10 | (Australia) J Kubler | 6 | 7
5 | (Israel) D Sela | 2 | 5

Quarterfinals
16 | (South Korea) D-h Lee | 2 | 3
10 | (Australia) J Kubler | 6 | 6

==== Section 2 ====
First round
(Japan) K Uchida | 6 | 6
(United States) Roy Smith | 3 | 4
(Brazil) J Menezes | 6 | 6
Q | (United States) D Novikov | 4 | 2
(China) Z Li | 1 | 1
Alt | (Austria) M Neuchrist | 6 | 6
(Spain) R Ortega Olmedo | 1 | 4
ITF | (Tunisia) S Mansouri | 6 | 6

Second round
3 | (Canada) P Polansky | 5 | 6 | 6
(Japan) K Uchida | 7 | 2 | 1
(Brazil) J Menezes | 4 | 6 | 6
(Australia) A Harris | 6 | 3 | 4
LL | (United Kingdom) B Klein | 4 | 5
Alt | (Austria) M Neuchrist | 6 | 7
ITF | (Tunisia) S Mansouri | 0 | 4
6 | (Slovakia) N Gombos | 6 | 6

Third round
3 | (Canada) P Polansky | 6 | 4 | 2
(Brazil) J Menezes | 4 | 6 | 6
Alt | (Austria) M Neuchrist | 6^{5} | 3
6 | (Slovakia) N Gombos | 7^{7} | 6

Quarterfinals
(Brazil) J Menezes | 4 | 7 | 7
6 | (Slovakia) N Gombos | 6 | 5 | 5

=== Bottom half ===
==== Section 3 ====
First round
(Japan) Yo Watanuki | 6^{6} | 6 | 6
Q | (Australia) Jacob Grills | 7^{8} | 1 | 0
WC | (Canada) L Draxl | 6 | 6
ITF | (United States) Jordi Arconada | 2 | 4
(Croatia) B Gojo | 5 | 6 | 6
WC | (Canada) B Sigouin | 7 | 3 | 2
(United States) C Altamirano | 1 | 6^{1}
WC | (United States) B Holt | 6 | 7^{7}

Second round
8 | (Japan) Y Uchiyama | 6 | 6
(Japan) Yo Watanuki | 4 | 2
WC | (Canada) L Draxl | 6 | 5 | 2
12 | (Barbados) D King | 3 | 7 | 6
13 | (France) M Janvier | 4 | 7^{7} | 6
(Croatia) B Gojo | 6 | 6^{4} | 3
WC | (United States) B Holt | 4 | 2
4 | (United States) M Mmoh | 6 | 6

Third round
8 | (Japan) Y Uchiyama | 6 | 2 | 3
12 | (Barbados) D King | 4 | 6 | 6
13 | (France) M Janvier | 7 | 5 | 6
4 | (United States) M Mmoh | 5 | 7 | 4

Quarterfinals
12 | (Barbados) D King | 6 | 1 | 6
13 | (France) M Janvier | 3 | 6 | 1

==== Section 4 ====
First round
(Australia) M Banes | 3 | 2
(Turkey) C İlkel | 6 | 6
(United States) J. J. Wolf | 6 | 6
(France) G Sakharov | 4 | 2
(Australia) A Santillan | 6 | 3 | 1
PR | (Spain) C Gómez-Herrera | 3 | 6 | 6
ITF | (Japan) Shintaro Imai | 6 | 2 | 7
ITF | (Chile) A Tabilo | 4 | 6 | 5

Second round
7 | (Denmark) M Torpegaard | 4 | 6 | 2
(Turkey) C İlkel | 6 | 4 | 6
(United States) J. J. Wolf | 3 | 6 | 5
11 | (Australia) M Polmans | 6 | 4 | 7
15 | (France) E Couacaud | 6 | 6
PR | (Spain) C Gómez-Herrera | 2 | 3
ITF | (Japan) S Imai | 2 | 3
2 | (South Korea) S-w Kwon | 6 | 6

Third round
(Turkey) C İlkel | 3 | 6 | 1
11 | (Australia) M Polmans | 6 | 1 | 6
15 | (France) E Couacaud | 7 | 7
2 | (South Korea) S-w Kwon | 5 | 5

Quarterfinals
11 | (Australia) M Polmans | 1 | 4
15 | (France) E Couacaud | 6 | 6
