= 2021 Open Castilla y León – Doubles =

Tennis tournament

Doubles
- 2021 Open Castilla y León

Final
- Champions: (United States) Robert Galloway (United States) Alex Lawson
- Runners-up: (United States) JC Aragone (Colombia) Nicolás Barrientos
- Score: 7–6^{(10–8)}, 6–4

Events
Singles	Doubles
- Open Castilla y León

Sander Arends and David Pel were the defending champions but chose not to defend their title.

Robert Galloway and Alex Lawson won the title after defeating JC Aragone and Nicolás Barrientos 7–6^{(10–8)}, 6–4 in the final.

== Seeds ==
1. (United States) Robert Galloway / (United States) Alex Lawson (champions)
2. (India) Arjun Kadhe / (Portugal) Gonçalo Oliveira (semifinals)
3. (India) Jeevan Nedunchezhiyan / (India) Purav Raja (first round, retired)
4. (Ecuador) Diego Hidalgo / (Spain) Sergio Martos Gornés (quarterfinals)

== Draw ==
Key

- Q = Qualifier
- WC = Wild card
- LL = Lucky loser
- Alt = Alternate
- ITF = ITF entry
- PR = Protected ranking
- SR = Special ranking
- SE = Special exempt
- JE = Junior exempt
- JR = Junior Accelerator Programme entrant
- CO = College Accelerator Programme entrant
- NG = Next Gen Accelerator Program entrant
- w/o = Walkover
- r = Retired
- d = Defaulted

First round
(Moldova) A Cozbinov (Russia) P Kotov	1	4
(Germany) F Fallert (United States) N Moreno de Alboran	6	6
4	(Ecuador) D Hidalgo (Spain) S Martos Gornés	6	6
(Spain) C Gómez-Herrera (Tunisia) M Jaziri	4	1
(United States) N Chappell (United Kingdom) R Peniston
WC	(Netherlands) M Vervoort (Bolivia) F Zeballos	w/o
(Tunisia) S Mansouri (Spain) A Menéndez Maceiras	2	6^{4}
(Switzerland) M-A Hüsler (Argentina) R Olivo	6	7^{7}
(United States) JC Aragone (Colombia) N Barrientos	2
3	(India) J Nedunchezhiyan (India) P Raja	1^{r}
(Romania) FC Jianu (Spain) N Sánchez Izquierdo
(Spain) John Echeverría (Bolivia) A Mendoza	w/o

Quarterfinals
1	(United States) R Galloway (United States) A Lawson	6	6
(Germany) F Fallert (United States) N Moreno de Alboran	4	4
4	(Ecuador) D Hidalgo (Spain) S Martos Gornés	6^{4}	6	[9]
WC	(Netherlands) M Vervoort (Bolivia) F Zeballos	7^{7}	4	[11]
(Switzerland) M-A Hüsler (Argentina) R Olivo	6^{7}	6^{2}
(United States) JC Aragone (Colombia) N Barrientos	7^{9}	7^{7}
(Spain) J Echeverría (Bolivia) A Mendoza	1	4
2	(India) A Kadhe (Portugal) G Oliveira	6	6

Semifinals
1	(United States) R Galloway (United States) A Lawson	6	6
WC	(Netherlands) M Vervoort (Bolivia) F Zeballos	3	4
(United States) JC Aragone (Colombia) N Barrientos	6	6
2	(India) A Kadhe (Portugal) G Oliveira	3	4

Final
1	(United States) R Galloway (United States) A Lawson	7^{10}	6
(United States) JC Aragone (Colombia) N Barrientos	6^{8}	4
