= Challenger de Gatineau =

Tennis tournament in Quebec, Canada

Challenger Banque Nationale de Gatineau
- 2019 Challenger Banque Nationale de Gatineau

Tournament information
- Founded: 2014; 12 years ago
- Abolished: 2019; 7 years ago
- Location: Gatineau, Quebec; Canada
- Venue: Parc de l'Île
- Surface: Hard – outdoors
- Website: Official website
ATP Tour
- Category: ATP Challenger Tour
- Draw: 32S (29Q) / 16D (0Q)
- Prize money: US$75,000
WTA Tour
- Category: ITF Women's Circuit
- Draw: 32S (32Q) / 16D (0Q)
- Prize money: US$25,000

The Challenger de Gatineau, currently sponsored as Challenger Banque Nationale de Gatineau, was a professional tennis tournament played on outdoor hard courts. It was part of the ATP Challenger Tour and the ITF Women's Circuit. It was held annually in Gatineau, Quebec, Canada, since 2014 for women and since 2016 for men. It was cancelled in September 2019.

== Past finals ==
=== Men's singles ===
Year	Champions	Runners-up	Score
2019	(Australia) Jason Kubler	(France) Enzo Couacaud	6–4, 6–4
2018	(United States) Bradley Klahn	(France) Ugo Humbert	6–3, 7–6^{(7–5)}
2017	(Canada) Denis Shapovalov	(Canada) Peter Polansky	6–1, 3–6, 6–3
2016	(Canada) Peter Polansky	(France) Vincent Millot	3–6, 6–4, ret.

=== Women's singles ===
Year	Champions	Runners-up	Score
2019	(Canada) Leylah Annie Fernandez	(Canada) Carson Branstine	3–6, 6–1, 6–2
2018	(Australia) Astra Sharma	(Mexico) Victoria Rodríguez	3–6, 6–4, 6–3
2017	(Canada) Aleksandra Wozniak	(Australia) Ellen Perez	7–6^{(7–4)}, 6–4
2016	(Canada) Bianca Andreescu	(United States) Ellie Halbauer	6–2, 7–5
2015	(United States) Alexa Glatch	(Canada) Bianca Andreescu	6–4, 6–3
2014	(France) Stéphanie Foretz	(Canada) Françoise Abanda	6–3, 3–6, 6–3

=== Men's doubles ===
Year	Champions	Runners-up	Score
2019	(United States) Alex Lawson (Australia) Marc Polmans	(Mexico) Hans Hach Verdugo (United States) Dennis Novikov	6–4, 3–6, [10–7]
2018	(United States) Robert Galloway (United States) Bradley Klahn	(Barbados) Darian King (Canada) Peter Polansky	7–6^{(7–4)}, 4–6, [10–8]
2017	(United States) Bradley Klahn (United States) Jackson Withrow	(Mexico) Hans Hach Verdugo (France) Vincent Millot	6–2, 6–3
2016	(France) Tristan Lamasine (Croatia) Franko Škugor	(Australia) Jarryd Chaplin (Australia) John-Patrick Smith	6–3, 6–1

=== Women's doubles ===
Year	Champions	Runners-up	Score
2019	(Canada) Leylah Annie Fernandez (Canada) Rebecca Marino	(Chinese Taipei) Hsu Chieh-yu (Mexico) Marcela Zacarías	7–6^{(7–5)}, 6–3
2018	(Canada) Bianca Andreescu (Canada) Carson Branstine	(Chinese Taipei) Hsu Chieh-yu (Mexico) Victoria Rodríguez	4–6, 6–2, [10–4]
2017	(Japan) Hiroko Kuwata (Russia) Valeria Savinykh	(Australia) Kimberly Birrell (United Kingdom) Emily Webley-Smith	4–6, 6–3, [10–5]
2016	(Canada) Bianca Andreescu (Canada) Charlotte Robillard-Millette	(Japan) Mana Ayukawa (United Kingdom) Samantha Murray	4–6, 6–4, [10–6]
2015	(Australia) Jessica Moore (Canada) Carol Zhao	(Mexico) Victoria Rodríguez (Mexico) Marcela Zacarías	6–3, 6–4
2014	(Japan) Hiroko Kuwata (Japan) Chiaki Okadaue	(Japan) Mana Ayukawa (Poland) Justyna Jegiołka	6–4, 6–3
