= 2018 Challenger Banque Nationale de Gatineau =

- Date: July 16–22
- Edition: 3rd (men); 5th (women)
- Category: ATP Challenger Tour; ITF Women's Circuit
- Surface: Hard – outdoors
- Location: Gatineau, Canada
- Venue: Parc de l'Île

Champions

Men's singles
- (United States) Bradley Klahn

Women's singles
- (Australia) Astra Sharma

Men's doubles
- (United States) Robert Galloway / (United States) Bradley Klahn

Women's doubles
- (Canada) Bianca Andreescu / (Canada) Carson Branstine
- Challenger de Gatineau

The 2018 Challenger Banque Nationale de Gatineau was a professional tennis tournament played on outdoor hard courts. It was the 3rd edition of the tournament for men and the 5th for women, and it was part of the 2018 ATP Challenger Tour and the 2018 ITF Women's Circuit. It took place in Gatineau, Canada between July 16 and 22, 2018.

== Men's singles main-draw entrants ==
=== Seeds ===
Country	Player	Rank^{1}	Seed
CAN	Peter Polansky	110	1
AUS	Jason Kubler	147	2
BAR	Darian King	160	3
JPN	Tatsuma Ito	165	4
USA	Bradley Klahn	168	5
GBR	Liam Broady	173	6
JPN	Go Soeda	178	7
CAN	Filip Peliwo	181	8

- ^{1} Rankings are as of July 2, 2018.

=== Other entrants ===
The following players received wildcards into the singles main draw:

- (Canada) Alexis Galarneau
- (Canada) Pavel Krainik
- (Canada) Samuel Monette
- (Canada) Benjamin Sigouin

The following players received entry from the qualifying draw:

- (South Korea) Chung Yun-seong
- (Australia) Jacob Grills
- (Israel) Edan Leshem
- (Venezuela) Ricardo Rodríguez

== Women's singles main-draw entrants ==
=== Seeds ===
Country	Player	Rank^{1}	Seed
AUS	Arina Rodionova	121	1
AUS	Olivia Rogowska	151	2
CAN	Bianca Andreescu	184	3
ISR	Julia Glushko	205	4
CAN	Katherine Sebov	268	5
ITA	Georgia Brescia	281	6
USA	Sophie Chang	288	7
MEX	Victoria Rodríguez	299	8

- ^{1} Rankings are as of July 2, 2018.

=== Other entrants ===
The following players received wildcards into the singles main draw:

- (Canada) Bianca Andreescu
- (Canada) Ariana Arseneault
- (Canada) Layne Sleeth
- (Canada) Alexandra Vagramov

The following player received entry as a special exempt:

- (Australia) Maddison Inglis

The following players received entry from the qualifying draw:

- (United Kingdom) Alicia Barnett
- (United Kingdom) Jodie Anna Burrage
- (United States) Nadja Gilchrist
- (Japan) Nagi Hanatani
- (Japan) Mai Hontama
- (United States) Raveena Kingsley
- (Canada) Catherine Leduc
- (United States) Jada Robinson

The following player received entry as a lucky loser:

- (United Kingdom) Samantha Murray

== Champions ==
=== Men's singles ===
- (United States) Bradley Klahn def. (France) Ugo Humbert 6–3, 7–6^{(7–5)}.

=== Women's singles ===
- (Australia) Astra Sharma def. (Mexico) Victoria Rodríguez, 3–6, 6–4, 6–3

=== Men's doubles ===
- (United States) Robert Galloway / (United States) Bradley Klahn def. (Barbados) Darian King / (Canada) Peter Polansky 7–6^{(7–4)}, 4–6, [10–8].

=== Women's doubles ===
- (Canada) Bianca Andreescu / (Canada) Carson Branstine def. (Chinese Taipei) Hsu Chieh-yu / (Mexico) Marcela Zacarías, 4–6, 6–2, [10–4]
