= 2017 Challenger Banque Nationale de Gatineau – Men's doubles =

Men's doubles
- 2017 Challenger Banque Nationale de Gatineau

Final
- Champions: (United States) Bradley Klahn (United States) Jackson Withrow
- Runners-up: (Mexico) Hans Hach Verdugo (France) Vincent Millot
- Score: 6–2, 6–3

Events
Singles	men	women
Doubles	men	women
- Challenger de Gatineau

Tristan Lamasine and Franko Škugor were the defending champions but chose not to defend their title.

Bradley Klahn and Jackson Withrow won the title after defeating Hans Hach Verdugo and Vincent Millot 6–2, 6–3 in the final.

== Seeds ==
1. (China) Gong Maoxin / (China) Zhang Ze (semifinals)
2. (United Kingdom) Luke Bambridge / (Republic of Ireland) David O'Hare (first round)
3. (Australia) Jarryd Chaplin / (United Kingdom) Joe Salisbury (first round)
4. (Canada) Philip Bester / (Canada) Peter Polansky (quarterfinals)

== Draw ==
Key

- Q = Qualifier
- WC = Wild card
- LL = Lucky loser
- Alt = Alternate
- ITF = ITF entry
- PR = Protected ranking
- SR = Special ranking
- SE = Special exempt
- JE = Junior exempt
- JR = Junior Accelerator Programme entrant
- CO = College Accelerator Programme entrant
- NG = Next Gen Accelerator Program entrant
- w/o = Walkover
- r = Retired
- d = Defaulted

First round
1	(China) M Gong (China) Z Zhang	6	6
(Chinese Taipei) J Jung (United States) D Nguyen	4	2
(United States) S Bangoura (Philippines) R Gonzales	6^{6}	1
(Australia) O Jasika (Australia) B Mousley	7^{8}	6
3	(Australia) Jarryd Chaplin (United Kingdom) J Salisbury	2	6	[5]
(Mexico) H Hach Verdugo (France) V Millot	6	1	[10]
WC	(Canada) S Diez (Canada) B Schnur	6	6
(Uruguay) M Felder (Japan) H Moriya	1	2
(Chinese Taipei) T Chen (Japan) G Soeda	1	4
PR	(United States) B Klahn (United States) J Withrow	6	6
(Tunisia) M Jaziri (Venezuela) LD Martínez	3	2
4	(Canada) P Bester (Canada) P Polansky	6	6
WC	(Canada) Hugo Di Feo (Canada) Samuel Monette	2	6	[7]
WC	(Canada) F Peliwo (Canada) D Shapovalov	6	3	[10]
(India) Y Bhambri (Japan) Y Uchiyama	7	6
2	(United Kingdom) L Bambridge (Republic of Ireland) D O'Hare	5	1

Quarterfinals
1	(China) M Gong (China) Z Zhang	6	5	[10]
(Australia) O Jasika (Australia) B Mousley	4	7	[4]
(Mexico) H Hach Verdugo (France) V Millot	5	6	[10]
WC	(Canada) S Diez (Canada) B Schnur	7	4	[5]
PR	(United States) B Klahn (United States) J Withrow	6	6
4	(Canada) P Bester (Canada) P Polansky	3	4
WC	(Canada) F Peliwo (Canada) D Shapovalov	7^{9}	6
(India) Y Bhambri (Japan) Y Uchiyama	6^{7}	4

Semifinals
1	(China) M Gong (China) Z Zhang	3	6^{4}
(Mexico) H Hach Verdugo (France) V Millot	6	7^{7}
PR	(United States) B Klahn (United States) J Withrow	5	7^{7}	[10]
WC	(Canada) F Peliwo (Canada) D Shapovalov	7	6^{5}	[5]

Final
(Mexico) H Hach Verdugo (France) V Millot	2	3
PR	(United States) B Klahn (United States) J Withrow	6	6
