= 2017 Challenger Banque Nationale de Gatineau – Men's singles =

Men's singles
- 2017 Challenger Banque Nationale de Gatineau

Final
- Champion: (Canada) Denis Shapovalov
- Runner-up: (Canada) Peter Polansky
- Score: 6–1, 3–6, 6–3

Events
Singles	men	women
Doubles	men	women
- Challenger de Gatineau

Peter Polansky was the defending champion but lost in the final to Denis Shapovalov.

Shapovalov won the title after defeating Polansky 6–1, 3–6, 6–3 in the final.

== Seeds ==
1. (Tunisia) Malek Jaziri (semifinals)
2. (Italy) Thomas Fabbiano (quarterfinals)
3. (Slovenia) Blaž Kavčič (second round, retired)
4. (Japan) Go Soeda (second round)
5. (Canada) Peter Polansky (final)
6. (Chinese Taipei) Jason Jung (first round)
7. (Canada) Denis Shapovalov (champion)
8. (France) Vincent Millot (quarterfinals)

== Draw ==
Key

- Q = Qualifier
- WC = Wild card
- LL = Lucky loser
- Alt = Alternate
- ITF = ITF entry
- PR = Protected ranking
- SR = Special ranking
- SE = Special exempt
- JE = Junior exempt
- JR = Junior Accelerator Programme entrant
- CO = College Accelerator Programme entrant
- NG = Next Gen Accelerator Program entrant
- w/o = Walkover
- r = Retired
- d = Defaulted

=== Finals ===
Semifinals
1	(Tunisia) Malek Jaziri	6	1	2
5	(Canada) Peter Polansky	4	6	6
(United States) Alexander Sarkissian	3	4
7	(Canada) Denis Shapovalov	6	6

Final
5	(Canada) Peter Polansky	1	6	3
7	(Canada) Denis Shapovalov	6	3	6

=== Top half ===
First round
1	(Tunisia) M Jaziri	6	6
Alt	(United States) D Nguyen	1	0
PR	(United States) B Klahn	3	6^{5}
(Canada) B Schnur	6	7^{7}
WC	(United Kingdom) L Broady	6	2	7
(Slovenia) B Rola	2	6	5
(China) Z Zhang	4	7	2
8	(France) V Millot	6	5	6
4	(Japan) G Soeda	6	6
(Chinese Taipei) T Chen	4	4
Q	(United States) M Giron	6	6
WC	(Canada) F Peliwo	2	0
(United States) M McDonald	3	0^{r}
Q	(United States) JC Aragone	6	1
(Japan) H Moriya	2	2
5	(Canada) P Polansky	6	6

Second round
1	(Tunisia) M Jaziri	6^{4}	7^{7}	6
(Canada) B Schnur	7^{7}	6^{2}	1
WC	(United Kingdom) L Broady	2	6	2
8	(France) V Millot	6	1	6
4	(Japan) G Soeda	2	1
Q	(United States) M Giron	6	6
Q	(United States) JC Aragone	6	3	1
5	(Canada) P Polansky	3	6	6

Quarterfinals
1	(Tunisia) M Jaziri	6	1	7
8	(France) V Millot	4	6	5
Q	(United States) M Giron	6	3	3
5	(Canada) P Polansky	3	6	6

Semifinals
1	(Tunisia) M Jaziri	6	1	2
5	(Canada) P Polansky	4	6	6

=== Bottom half ===
First round
6	(Chinese Taipei) J Jung	3	6^{5}
(Japan) Y Uchiyama	6	7^{7}
(Canada) S Diez	3	2
(United States) A Sarkissian	6	6
(India) Y Bhambri	6	6
(Japan) T Ito	3	2
Q	(Denmark) M Torpegaard	2	1
3	(Slovenia) B Kavčič	6	6
7	(Canada) D Shapovalov	6	3	6
WC	(Canada) P Bester	3	6	3
(Israel) E Leshem	1	0^{r}
Alt	(Australia) M Purcell	6	0
WC	(Canada) B Sigouin	1	3
Q	(United States) S Bangoura	6	6
(Australia) O Jasika	6	1	1
2	(Italy) T Fabbiano	0	6	6

Second round
(Japan) Y Uchiyama	4	6	5
(United States) A Sarkissian	6	4	7
(India) Y Bhambri	7^{7}	3
3	(Slovenia) B Kavčič	6^{1}	1^{r}
7	(Canada) D Shapovalov	6	6
Alt	(Australia) M Purcell	1	2
Q	(United States) S Bangoura	5	6^{3}
2	(Italy) T Fabbiano	7	7^{7}

Quarterfinals
(United States) A Sarkissian	6	4	6
(India) Y Bhambri	3	6	4
7	(Canada) D Shapovalov	6	3	6
2	(Italy) T Fabbiano	3	6	3

Semifinals
(United States) A Sarkissian	3	4
7	(Canada) D Shapovalov	6	6
