= Alex Lawson =

American tennis player (born 1994)

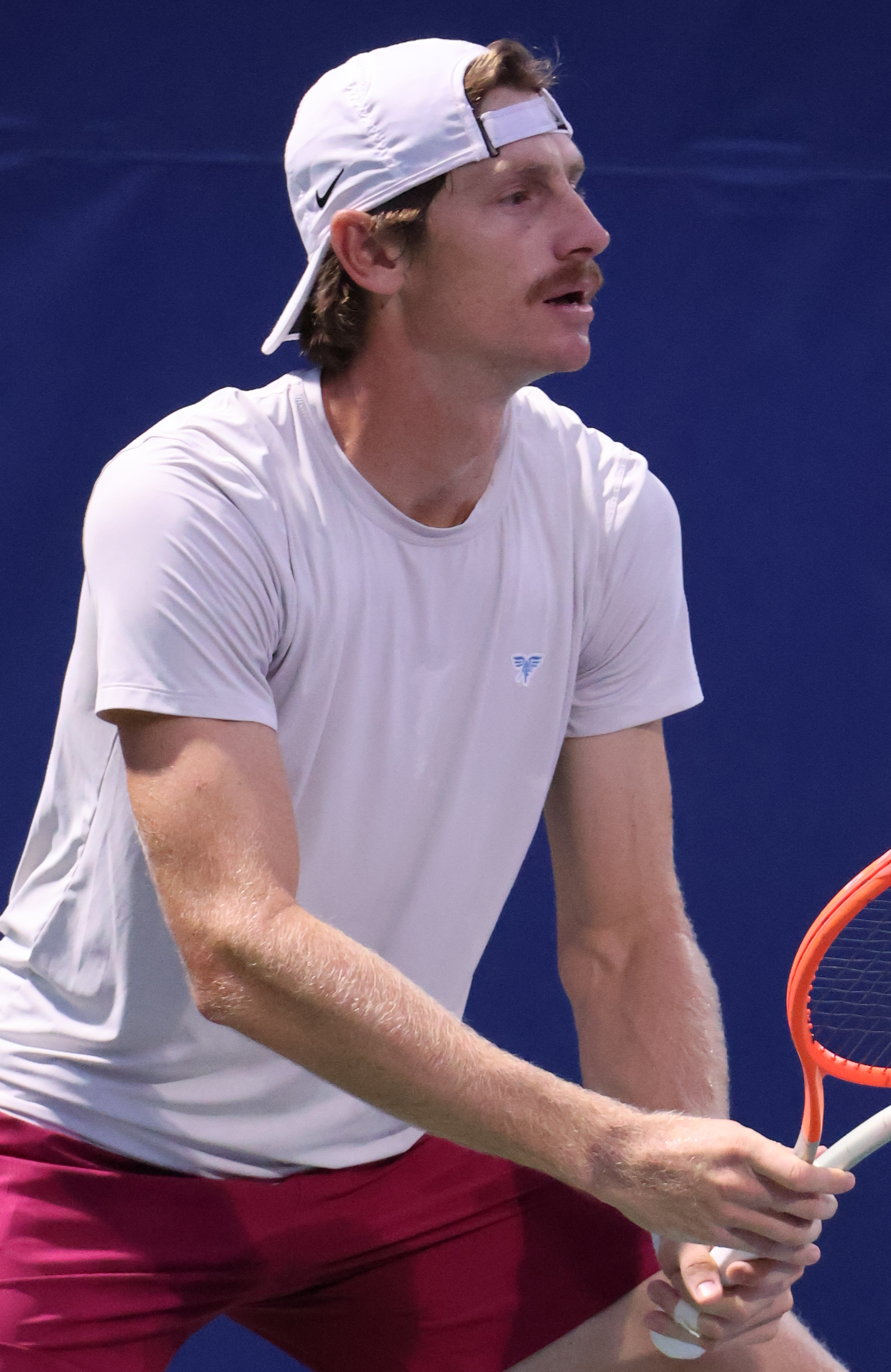
- Lawson at the 2023 Cary Challenger II
- Country (sports): United States
- Born: January 31, 1994 (age 32) Tempe, Arizona, USA
- Height: 6 ft 3 in (191 cm)
- Plays: Left-handed (two-handed backhand)
- College: University of Notre Dame
- Coach: Ford Oliver
- Prize money: $198,653

Singles
- Highest ranking: No. 1373 (15 August 2022)

Doubles
- Career record: 9-13
- Career titles: 4 Challenger, 4 Futures
- Highest ranking: No. 101 (25 July 2022)
- Current ranking: No. 199 (17 March 2025)

Grand Slam doubles results
- US Open: 2R (2021, 2022)
- Last updated on: 30 March 2025.

Alex Lawson (born January 31, 1994) is an American tennis player who specializes in doubles. He has a career-high ATP doubles ranking of world No. 101 achieved on 25 July 2022. He has reached 30 career doubles finals posting a record of 8 wins and 22 losses, which includes a 4–12 record in ATP Challenger finals.

== Career ==
He won the 2018 Granby Challenger alongside Chinese player Zhe Li, the 2019 Gatineau Challenger with Aussie Marc Polmans, the 2021 Cleveland Open and the Segovia Challenger pairing up with compatriot Robert Galloway.

Lawson made his ATP main draw debut at the 2016 Hall of Fame Tennis Championships on grass courts in Newport, USA where he was given a wildcard entry into the main doubles draw alongside compatriot Mackenzie McDonald. They were defeated in the first round in two tie-break sets by British brother duo Neal Skupski and Ken Skupski 6–7^{(4–7)}, 6–7^{(7–9)}.

== ATP Challenger and ITF Futures finals ==
=== Doubles: 30 (8–22) ===
Legend ATP Challenger (4–12) ITF Futures (4–10)	Finals by surface Hard (8–12) Clay (0–8) Grass (0–0) Carpet (0–2)

Result	W–L	Date	Tournament	Tier	Surface	Partner	Opponents	Score
Loss	0–1	Aug 2016	USA F27, Champaign	Futures	Hard	(United States) Tim Kopinski	(United States) Jared Hiltzik (Germany) Dominik Koepfer	6–3, 3–6, [9–11]
Loss	0–2	Sep 2016	Egypt F23, Cairo	Futures	Hard	(Zimbabwe) Benjamin Lock	(Brazil) Pedro Bernardi (Argentina) M Nicolas Martinez	6–7^{(4–7)}, 3–6
Loss	0–3	Nov 2016	USA F35, Birmingham	Futures	Clay	(United States) Austin Smith	(United States) Hunter Johnson (United States) Yates Johnson	2–6, 4–6
Loss	0–4	Mar 2017	USA F11 Calabasas	Futures	Hard	(United Kingdom) Farris Fathi Gosea	(United States) Bradley Klahn (United States) Connor Smith	4–6, 7–6^{(7–5)}, [5–10]
Loss	0–5	Apr 2017	USA F12 Memphis	Futures	Hard	(Canada) Philip Bester	(United Kingdom) Lloyd Glasspool (United States) Mackenzie McDonald	2–6, 6–7^{(3–7)}
Loss	0–6	Jun 2017	Spain F16, Huelva	Futures	Clay	(Mexico) Hans Hach	(Brazil) Pedro Bernardi (Brazil) Guilherme Clezar	6–4, 4–6, [9–11]
Loss	0–7	Aug 2017	USA F27, Edwardsville	Futures	Hard	(United States) Robert Galloway	(United States) Hunter Callahan (Sweden) Gustav Hansson	3–6, 4–6
Win	1–7	Sep 2017	France F20, Plaisir	Futures	Hard	(United States) Nathaniel Lammons	(France) Antoine Hoang (France) Grégoire Jacq	4–6, 7–6^{(9–7)}, [10–4]
Loss	1–8	Oct 2017	France F22, Nevers	Futures	Hard	(United States) Nathaniel Lammons	(France) Antoine Hoang (France) Benjamin Bonzi	6–7^{(5–7)}, 4–6
Loss	1–9	Oct 2017	France F23, Saint-Dizier	Futures	Hard	(United States) Nathaniel Lammons	(France) Jonathan Kanar (France) Mick Lescure	6–0, 4–6, [9–11]
Win	2–9	Oct 2017	France F24, Rodez	Futures	Hard	(United States) Nathaniel Lammons	(France) Antoine Hoang (France) Ugo Humbert	7–6^{(7–4)}, 4–6, [10–7]
Loss	2–10	Dec 2017	USA F39, Waco	Futures	Hard	(United States) Nathaniel Lammons	(Germany) Julian Lenz (Venezuela) Roberto Maytín	6–7^{(5–7)}, 6–1, [12–14]
Win	3–10	Dec 2017	USA F40, Tallahassee	Futures	Hard	(United States) Nathaniel Lammons	(United States) Jose E Gracia (France) Lucas Poullain	6–3, 6–0
Win	4–10	Jul 2018	Granby, Canada	Challenger	Hard	(China) Zhe Li	(United States) JC Aragone (United Kingdom) Liam Broady	7–6^{(7–2)}, 6–3
Win	5–10	Jul 2019	Gatineau, Canada	Challenger	Hard	(Australia) Marc Polmans	(Mexico) Hans Hach (United States) Dennis Novikov	6–4, 3–6, [10–7]
Loss	5–11	Jul 2019	Binghamton, United States	Challenger	Hard	(United States) JC Aragone	(Australia) Luke Saville (Australia) Max Purcell	4–6, 6–4, [5–10]
Win	6–11	Jan 2020	M25 Rancho Santa Fe, United States	World Tennis Tour	Hard	(United Kingdom) Lloyd Glasspool	(United States) Sekou Bangoura (Bolivia) Boris Arias	6–1, 7–6^{(7–1)}
Loss	6–12	Mar 2020	Columbus, United States	Challenger	Hard	(United Kingdom) Lloyd Glasspool	(Philippines) Treat Huey (United States) Nathaniel Lammons	6–7^{(3–7)}, 6–7^{(4–7)}
Loss	6–13	Oct 2020	Biella, Italy	Challenger	Clay	(United Kingdom) Lloyd Glasspool	(Finland) Harri Heliövaara (Poland) Szymon Walków	5–7, 3–6
Loss	6–14	Oct 2020	Barcelona, Spain	Challenger	Clay	(Finland) Harri Heliövaara	(Austria) Tristan-Samuel Weissborn (Poland) Szymon Walków	1–6, 6–4, [8–10]
Loss	6–15	Oct 2020	Ismaning, Germany	Challenger	Carpet	(United Kingdom) Lloyd Glasspool	(Germany) Andre Begemann (Netherlands) David Pel	7–5, 6–7^{(2–7)}, [4–10]
Loss	6–16	Nov 2020	Hamburg, Germany	Challenger	Hard	(United Kingdom) Lloyd Glasspool	(Austria) Marc-Andrea Hüsler (Poland) Kamil Majchrzak	3–6, 6–1, [18–20]
Loss	6–17	Nov 2020	Eckental, Germany	Challenger	Carpet	(United Kingdom) Lloyd Glasspool	(Germany) Dustin Brown (France) Antoine Hoang	7–6^{(10–8)}, 5–7, [11–13]
Loss	6–18	Feb 2021	Antalya II, Turkey	Challenger	Clay	(United States) Robert Galloway	(Ukraine) Denys Molchanov (Kazakhstan) Aleksandr Nedovyesov	4–6, 6–7^{(2–7)}
Win	7–18	Mar 2021	Cleveland, United States	Challenger	Hard	(United States) Robert Galloway	(United States) Hunter Reese (United States) Evan King	7–5, 6–7^{(5–7)}, [11–9]
Loss	7–19	June 2021	Aix-en-Provence, France	Challenger	Clay	(United States) Robert Galloway	(France) Sadio Doumbia (France) Fabien Reboul	7–6^{(7–4)}, 5–7, [4–10]
Loss	7–20	Jul 2021	Salzburg, Austria	Challenger	Clay	(United States) Robert Galloway	(Argentina) Facundo Bagnis (Peru) Sergio Galdós	0-6, 3–6
Win	8–20	Jul 2021	Segovia, Spain	Challenger	Hard	(United States) Robert Galloway	(United States) JC Aragone (Colombia) Nicolás Barrientos	7–6^{(10–8)}, 6–4
Loss	8–21	Jun 2022	Oeiras, Portugal	Challenger	Clay	(United States) Robert Galloway	(France) Sadio Doumbia (France) Fabien Reboul	3–6, 6–3, [13–15]
Loss	8–22	Oct 2022	Charlottesville, USA	Challenger	Hard (i)	(New Zealand) Artem Sitak	(United Kingdom) Julian Cash (United Kingdom) Henry Patten	2–6, 4–6
