= 2012 Levene Gouldin & Thompson Tennis Challenger – Doubles =

Doubles
- 2012 Levene Gouldin & Thompson Tennis Challenger

Final
- Champions: (Israel) Dudi Sela; (Israel) Harel Srugo
- Runners-up: (Switzerland) Adrien Bossel; (United States) Michael McClune
- Score: 6–2, 3–6, [10]

Events
Singles	Doubles
← 2011 ·	Levene Gouldin & Thompson Tennis Challenger	· 2013 →

Juan Sebastián Cabal and Robert Farah were the defending champions but decided not to participate.
Dudi Sela and Harel Srugo won the final against Adrien Bossel and Michael McClune 6–2, 3–6, [10].

== Seeds ==
1. (United States) Austin Krajicek / (South Africa) Izak van der Merwe (quarterfinals, withdrew)
2. (United States) Vahid Mirzadeh / (United States) Maciek Sykut (first round)
3. (United States) Tennys Sandgren / (United States) Rhyne Williams (semifinals)
4. (New Zealand) Daniel King-Turner / (France) Gleb Sakharov (first round)

== Draw ==
=== Key ===
- Q = Qualifier
- WC = Wild card
- LL = Lucky loser
- Alt = Alternate
- SE = Special exempt
- PR = Protected ranking
- ITF = ITF entry
- JE = Junior exempt
- w/o = Walkover
- r = Retired
- d = Defaulted
- SR = Special ranking

=== Draw ===
First round

Quarterfinals

Semifinals

Final

1
- (United States) A Krajicek
- (South Africa) I van der Merwe
7
6

WC
(United States) Andrew Carter
(United States) Patrick Daciek
5
3

1
- (United States) A Krajicek
- (South Africa) I van der Merwe

Q
(United States) Krasimir Kolev
(United States) Tsimafey Senkevich
1
2

- (Israel) D Sela
- (Israel) H Srugo
w/o

- (Israel) D Sela
- (Israel) H Srugo
6
6

- (Israel) D Sela
- (Israel) H Srugo
7^{7}
7

4
- (New Zealand) D King-Turner
- (France) G Sakharov
3
6^{3}

(United States) Shaun Bernstein
(United States) Evan King
6^{5}
5

- (United Kingdom) J Baker
- (United States) C Harrison
6
7^{7}

- (United Kingdom) J Baker
- (United States) C Harrison
3
7^{7}
[6]

(United States) Shaun Bernstein
(United States) Evan King
6
6

(United States) Shaun Bernstein
(United States) Evan King
6
6^{5}
[10]

(Lithuania) L Grigelis
(Italy) Andrea Stoppini
3
3

- (Israel) D Sela
- (Israel) H Srugo
6
3
[10]

WC
(United States) Derek Difazio
(United States) Craig Schwartz
0
3

- (Switzerland) Adrien Bossel
- (United States) M McClune
2
6
[8]

(Australia) G Jones
(United States) Greg Ouellette
6
6

(Australia) G Jones
(United States) Greg Ouellette
4
2

- (United States) D Courtney
- (United States) D Kudla
2
2

3
- (United States) T Sandgren
- (United States) R Williams
6
6

3
- (United States) T Sandgren
- (United States) R Williams
6
6

3
- (United States) T Sandgren
- (United States) R Williams
1
6^{6}

- (Philippines) R Gonzalez
- (New Zealand) M Venus
6
6

- (Switzerland) Adrien Bossel
- (United States) M McClune
6
7^{8}

WC
(United States) William Mendler
(United States) Alex Tsai
1
4

- (Philippines) R Gonzalez
- (New Zealand) M Venus
6^{3}
4

- (Switzerland) Adrien Bossel
- (United States) M McClune
7^{7}
2
[10]

- (Switzerland) Adrien Bossel
- (United States) M McClune
7^{7}
6

2
- (United States) V Mirzadeh
- (United States) M Sykut
6^{5}
6
[4]
