= 2013 Yeongwol Challenger Tennis – Singles =

Singles
- 2013 Yeongwol Challenger Tennis

Final
- Champion: (United States) Bradley Klahn
- Runner-up: (Japan) Taro Daniel
- Score: 7–6^{(7–5)}, 6–2

Events
Singles	Doubles
Yeongwol Challenger Tennis	· 2014 →

Bradley Klahn became the first champion of the event defeating Taro Daniel in the final.

== Seeds ==
1. (Germany) Julian Reister (second round)
2. (Australia) Matthew Ebden (second round)
3. (Slovenia) Blaž Kavčič (first round)
4. (United States) Bradley Klahn
5. (Serbia) Dušan Lajović (first round)
6. (United Kingdom) James Ward (first round)
7. (Bosnia and Herzegovina) Mirza Bašić (first round)
8. (Australia) Matt Reid (quarterfinals)

== Draw ==
=== Key ===
- Q = Qualifier
- WC = Wild card
- LL = Lucky loser
- Alt = Alternate
- ITF = ITF entry
- PR = Protected ranking
- SR = Special ranking
- SE = Special exempt
- JE = Junior exempt
- JR = Junior Accelerator Programme entrant
- CO = College Accelerator Programme entrant
- NG = Next Gen Accelerator Program entrant
- w/o = Walkover
- r = Retired
- d = Defaulted

=== Finals ===
Semifinals
(China) Di Wu	4	3
4	(United States) Bradley Klahn	6	6
(Republic of Ireland) James McGee	6	3	6^{8}
(Japan) Taro Daniel	6	3	7^{10}

Final
4	(United States) Bradley Klahn	7^{7}	6
(Japan) Taro Daniel	6^{5}	2

=== Top half ===
First round
1	(Germany) J Reister	6	7^{7}
Q	(United States) D Nguyen	2	6^{1}
(South Korea) Y-k Lim	6	1	6
(Chinese Taipei) L-c Huang	2	6	4
Q	(United Kingdom) A Ward	7^{7}	6
(Belgium) Y Reuter	6^{1}	1
(China) D Wu	6	6
5	(Serbia) D Lajović	2	2
4	(United States) B Klahn	6	6
SE	(United Kingdom) B Klein	4	1
LL	(Chinese Taipei) T Chen	3	7^{7}	6
WC	(South Korea) Hy Chung	6	6^{5}	0
(Russia) V Rudnev	6	6
Q	(United States) J Jung	3	4
(Belgium) G Gigounon	4	6	6
7	(Bosnia and Herzegovina) M Bašić	6	1	3

Second round
1	(Germany) J Reister	6	1	1
(South Korea) Y-k Lim	4	6	6
Q	(United Kingdom) A Ward	2	1
(China) D Wu	6	6
4	(United States) B Klahn	6	6
LL	(Chinese Taipei) T Chen	1	3
(Russia) V Rudnev	2	1
(Belgium) G Gigounon	6	6

Quarterfinals
(South Korea) Y-k Lim	1	0
(China) D Wu	6	6
4	(United States) B Klahn	3	6	6
(Belgium) G Gigounon	6	3	4

Semifinals
(China) D Wu	4	3
4	(United States) B Klahn	6	6

=== Bottom half ===
First round
8	(Australia) M Reid	6	6
WC	(South Korea) J-s Nam	2	4
(Chinese Taipei) T-h Yang	6^{4}	7^{7}	6
Q	(New Zealand) M Daniell	7^{7}	6^{5}	4
WC	(South Korea) Ho Chung	1	2
(Russia) A Kudryavtsev	6	6
(Republic of Ireland) J McGee	6	7
3	(Slovenia) B Kavčič	2	5
6	(United Kingdom) J Ward	5	1
(Japan) T Daniel	7	6
(China) Z Zhang	6	5	6
(Belgium) K Coppejans	4	7	3
(Spain) E López-Pérez	6	6
WC	(South Korea) S-y Jeong	3	3
PR	(United States) D Kosakowski	3	0
2	(Australia) M Ebden	6	6

Second round
8	(Australia) M Reid	6	6
(Chinese Taipei) T-h Yang	4	2
(Russia) A Kudryavtsev	4	0
(Republic of Ireland) J McGee	6	6
(Japan) T Daniel	6	7^{12}
(China) Z Zhang	2	6^{10}
(Spain) E López-Pérez	6	6
2	(Australia) M Ebden	2	4

Quarterfinals
8	(Australia) M Reid	6	5	0
(Republic of Ireland) J McGee	3	7	6
(Japan) T Daniel	6	6
(Spain) E López-Pérez	3	2

Semifinals
(Republic of Ireland) J McGee	6	3	6^{8}
(Japan) T Daniel	3	6	7^{10}
