= 2013 Yeongwol Challenger Tennis – Doubles =

Doubles
- 2013 Yeongwol Challenger Tennis

Final
- Champion: (Croatia) Marin Draganja (Croatia) Mate Pavić
- Runner-up: (Chinese Taipei) Lee Hsin-han (Chinese Taipei) Peng Hsien-yin
- Score: 6–4, 4–6, [10–7]

Events
Singles	Doubles
Yeongwol Challenger Tennis	· 2014 →

The Croatian pairing of Marin Draganja and Mate Pavić overcame Chinese Taipei's Lee Hsin-han and Peng Hsien-yin 6–4, 4–6, [10–7] in the final.

== Seeds ==
1. (Croatia) Marin Draganja / (Croatia) Mate Pavić (champions)
2. (Australia) Rameez Junaid / (Germany) Frank Moser (quarterfinals)
3. (Thailand) Sanchai Ratiwatana / (Thailand) Sonchat Ratiwatana (quarterfinals)
4. (Chinese Taipei) Lee Hsin-han / (Chinese Taipei) Peng Hsien-yin (final)

== Draw ==
=== Key ===
- Q = Qualifier
- WC = Wild card
- LL = Lucky loser
- Alt = Alternate
- SE = Special exempt
- PR = Protected ranking
- ITF = ITF entry
- JE = Junior exempt
- w/o = Walkover
- r = Retired
- d = Defaulted
- SR = Special ranking

=== Draw ===
First round
1	(Croatia) M Draganja (Croatia) M Pavić	6	6
WC	(South Korea) Hy Chung (South Korea) Y-k Lim	2	1
(Philippines) R Gonzales (New Zealand) A Sitak	6	6
PR	(Belarus) A Bury (United States) D Kosakowski	3	2
3	(Thailand) Sa Ratiwatana (Thailand) So Ratiwatana	7	6
(Japan) T Daniel (Republic of Ireland) J McGee	5	1
(Bosnia and Herzegovina) M Bašić (Chinese Taipei) T Chen	6	6
(China) D Wu (China) Z Zhang	1	3
WC	(South Korea) J-s Nam (South Korea) Noh Sang-woo	4	4
(United Kingdom) B Klein (Chinese Taipei) T-h Yang	6	6
(Chinese Taipei) L-c Huang (Spain) E López-Pérez	3	5
4	(Chinese Taipei) H-h Lee (Chinese Taipei) H-y Peng	6	7
(Australia) M Reid (United Kingdom) J Ward	4	1
WC	(South Korea) H-t Lee (Thailand) D Udomchoke	6	6
(Belarus) S Betov (Slovenia) B Kavčič	3	0
2	(Australia) R Junaid (Germany) F Moser	6	6

Quarterfinals
1	(Croatia) M Draganja (Croatia) M Pavić	4	6	[11]
(Philippines) R Gonzales (New Zealand) A Sitak	6	1	[9]
3	(Thailand) Sa Ratiwatana (Thailand) So Ratiwatana	0	6^{5}
(Bosnia and Herzegovina) M Bašić (Chinese Taipei) T Chen	6	7^{7}
(United Kingdom) B Klein (Chinese Taipei) T-h Yang	3	4
4	(Chinese Taipei) H-h Lee (Chinese Taipei) H-y Peng	6	6
WC	(South Korea) H-t Lee (Thailand) D Udomchoke	3	7	[10]
2	(Australia) R Junaid (Germany) F Moser	6	5	[3]

Semifinals
1	(Croatia) M Draganja (Croatia) M Pavić	6	7^{7}
(Bosnia and Herzegovina) M Bašić (Chinese Taipei) T Chen	3	6^{4}
4	(Chinese Taipei) H-h Lee (Chinese Taipei) H-y Peng	6	3	[10]
WC	(South Korea) H-t Lee (Thailand) D Udomchoke	2	6	[6]

Final
1	(Croatia) M Draganja (Croatia) M Pavić	6	4	[10]
4	(Chinese Taipei) H-h Lee (Chinese Taipei) H-y Peng	4	6	[7]
