= 2013 Traralgon Challenger – Doubles =

Doubles
- 2013 Traralgon Challenger

Final
- Champion: (Australia) Ryan Agar (Australia) Adam Feeney
- Runner-up: (Australia) Dane Propoggia (New Zealand) Jose Statham
- Score: 6–3, 6–4

Events
Singles	Doubles
Traralgon Challenger	· 2014 →

This is the first edition of the event.

Ryan Agar and Adam Feeney won the title, defeating Dane Propoggia and Jose Statham 6–3, 6–4 in the final.

== Seeds ==
1. (Australia) Chris Guccione / (Australia) Matt Reid (quarterfinals, withdrew)
2. (Australia) Dane Propoggia / (New Zealand) Jose Statham (final)
3. (United States) Bradley Klahn / (New Zealand) Michael Venus (semifinals)
4. (United Kingdom) Brydan Klein / (Thailand) Danai Udomchoke (quarterfinals)

== Draw ==
=== Key ===
- Q = Qualifier
- WC = Wild card
- LL = Lucky loser
- Alt = Alternate
- SE = Special exempt
- PR = Protected ranking
- ITF = ITF entry
- JE = Junior exempt
- w/o = Walkover
- r = Retired
- d = Defaulted
- SR = Special ranking

=== Draw ===
First round
(India) Y Bhambri (United States) M Krueger	4	4
(Australia) M Banes (Australia) Gavin van Peperzeel	6	6
4	(United Kingdom) B Klein (Thailand) D Udomchoke	7^{7}	7^{7}
(Australia) T Kokkinakis (Australia) B Mitchell	6^{1}	6^{5}
WC	(Australia) Chanchai Sookton-Eng (Australia) Richard Yang	2	0
(Australia) R Agar (Australia) A Feeney	6	6
(Australia) A Bolt (Australia) A Whittington	6	6
WC	(Australia) Paul Kramberger (Australia) William Ma	4	3
(Australia) Mitchell Burman (Australia) Darren K. Polkinghorne	1	2
3	(United States) B Klahn (New Zealand) M Venus	6	6
(Australia) K Hensel (Australia) Brendon Moore	7^{7}	1	[10]
(Australia) L Saville (Australia) J Thompson	6^{5}	6	[6]
(Australia) Ben Mathias (United Kingdom) J Ward	5	2
2	(Australia) D Propoggia (New Zealand) J Statham	7	6

Quarterfinals
1	(Australia) C Guccione (Australia) M Reid	w/o
(Australia) M Banes (Australia) G van Peperzeel
4	(United Kingdom) B Klein (Thailand) D Udomchoke	6^{8}	4
(Australia) R Agar (Australia) A Feeney	7^{10}	6
(Australia) A Bolt (Australia) A Whittington	4	5
3	(United States) B Klahn (New Zealand) M Venus	6	7
(Australia) K Hensel (Australia) B Moore	2	4
2	(Australia) D Propoggia (New Zealand) J Statham	6	6

Semifinals
(Australia) M Banes (Australia) G van Peperzeel	1	3
(Australia) R Agar (Australia) A Feeney	6	6
3	(United States) B Klahn (New Zealand) M Venus	6^{4}	3
2	(Australia) D Propoggia (New Zealand) J Statham	7^{7}	6

Final
(Australia) R Agar (Australia) A Feeney	6	6
2	(Australia) D Propoggia (New Zealand) J Statham	3	4
