= 2012 Levene Gouldin & Thompson Tennis Challenger =

Tennis tournament

- Date: 16–22 July
- Edition: 19th
- Surface: Hard
- Location: Binghamton, United States

Champions

Singles
- (United States) Michael Yani

Doubles
- (Israel) Dudi Sela / (Israel) Harel Srugo
← 2011 ·	Levene Gouldin & Thompson Tennis Challenger	· 2013 →

The 2012 Levene Gouldin & Thompson Tennis Challenger was a professional tennis tournament played on hard courts. It was the 19th edition of the tournament which was part of the 2012 ATP Challenger Tour. It took place in Binghamton, United States between 16 and 22 July 2012.

== Singles main-draw entrants ==
=== Seeds ===
Country	Player	Rank^{1}	Seed
ISR	Dudi Sela	115	1
SUI	Marco Chiudinelli	129	2
RSA	Izak van der Merwe	155	3
LTU	Laurynas Grigelis	183	4
USA	Robby Ginepri	187	5
GBR	Jamie Baker	196	6
USA	Denis Kudla	197	7
FRA	Adrian Mannarino	200	8

- ^{1} Rankings are as of July 9, 2012.

=== Other entrants ===
The following players received wildcards into the singles main draw:

- (United States) Bjorn Fratangelo
- (United States) Robby Ginepri
- (United States) Christian Harrison
- (United States) Mitchell Krueger

The following players received entry from the qualifying draw:

- (United States) Andrew Carter
- (United States) Mitchell Frank
- (New Zealand) Michael Venus
- (South Africa) Fritz Wolmarans

The following players received entry from the qualifying draw as a lucky loser:

- (United States) Maciek Sykut

== Champions ==
=== Singles ===
- (United States) Michael Yani def. (South Africa) Fritz Wolmarans, 6–4, 7–6^{(13–11)}

=== Doubles ===
- (Israel) Dudi Sela / (Israel) Harel Srugo vs. (Switzerland) Adrien Bossel / (United States) Michael McClune, 6–2, 3–6, [10]
