= 2019 Nielsen Pro Tennis Championship =

- Date: 8–14 July
- Edition: 28th
- Surface: Hard
- Location: Winnetka, Illinois, United States

Champions

Singles
- (United States) Bradley Klahn

Doubles
- (United States) JC Aragone / (United States) Bradley Klahn
- Nielsen Pro Tennis Championship

The 2019 Nielsen Pro Tennis Championship was a professional tennis tournament played on hard courts. It was the 28th edition of the tournament which was part of the 2019 ATP Challenger Tour. It took place in Winnetka, Illinois, between 8 and 14 July 2019.

== Singles main-draw entrants ==
=== Seeds ===
Country	Player	Rank^{1}	Seed
USA	Bradley Klahn	87	1
AUS	Matthew Ebden	95	2
ARG	Guido Andreozzi	114	3
UZB	Denis Istomin	115	4
TPE	Jason Jung	117	5
USA	Bjorn Fratangelo	133	6
ESP	Adrián Menéndez Maceiras	146	7
IND	Ramkumar Ramanathan	151	8
USA	Michael Mmoh	152	9
FRA	Quentin Halys	157	10
USA	Mitchell Krueger	183	11
AUS	Jason Kubler	188	12
AUS	Thanasi Kokkinakis	192	13
USA	Christopher Eubanks	193	14
USA	Donald Young	197	15
USA	Thai-Son Kwiatkowski	205	16

- ^{1} Rankings are as of July 1, 2019.

=== Other entrants ===
The following players received wildcards into the singles main draw:

- (United States) Stefan Dostanic
- (United States) Bjorn Fratangelo
- (Uzbekistan) Denis Istomin
- (United States) Sam Riffice
- (United States) Alex Rybakov

The following player received entry into the singles main draw using a protected ranking:

- (Austria) Maximilian Neuchrist

The following players received entry into the singles main draw using their ITF World Tennis Ranking:

- (United States) Jordi Arconada
- (United States) Sekou Bangoura
- (Tunisia) Aziz Dougaz
- (Greece) Michail Pervolarakis
- (United States) Martin Redlicki

The following players received entry from the qualifying draw:

- (United States) Felix Corwin
- (United States) John McNally

== Champions ==
=== Singles ===
- (United States) Bradley Klahn def. (Australia) Jason Kubler 6–2, 7–5.

=== Doubles ===
- (United States) JC Aragone / (United States) Bradley Klahn def. (United States) Christopher Eubanks / (United States) Thai-Son Kwiatkowski 7–5, 6–4.
