= 2013 Levene Gouldin & Thompson Tennis Challenger =

- Date: 15–21 July
- Edition: 20th
- Surface: Hard court
- Location: Binghamton, United States

Champions

Singles
- (United States) Alex Kuznetsov

Doubles
- (United States) Bradley Klahn / (New Zealand) Michael Venus
← 2012 ·	Levene Gouldin & Thompson Tennis Challenger	· 2014 →

The 2013 Levene Gouldin & Thompson Tennis Challenger was a professional tennis tournament played on hard court. It was the 19th edition of the tournament which was part of the 2013 ATP Challenger Tour. It took place in Binghamton, United States between 15 and 21 July 2013.

== Singles main-draw entrants ==
=== Seeds ===
Country	Player	Rank^{1}	Seed
USA	Rhyne Williams	129	1
GER	Mischa Zverev	146	2
JPN	Yūichi Sugita	148	3
USA	Donald Young	152	4
USA	Bradley Klahn	162	5
USA	Alex Kuznetsov	163	6
TUN	Malek Jaziri	178	7
UZB	Farrukh Dustov	198	8

- ^{1} Rankings are as of July 9, 2013.

=== Other entrants ===
The following players received wildcards into the singles main draw:

- (United States) Jarmere Jenkins
- (United States) Dennis Novikov
- (United States) Rhyne Williams
- (United States) Donald Young

The following players received entry from the qualifying draw:

- (Zimbabwe) Takanyi Garanganga
- (United States) Mitchell Krueger
- (Denmark) Frederik Nielsen
- (United States) Greg Ouellette

== Champions ==
=== Singles ===
- (United States) Alex Kuznetsov def. (United States) Bradley Klahn, 6–4, 3–6, 6–3

=== Doubles ===
- (United States) Bradley Klahn / (New Zealand) Michael Venus def. (Australia) Adam Feeney / (Australia) John-Patrick Smith, 6–3, 6–4
