= 2013 Yeongwol Challenger Tennis =

- Date: 4–10 November
- Edition: 1st
- Surface: Carpet
- Location: Yeongwol, South Korea

Champions

Singles
- (United States) Bradley Klahn

Doubles
- (Croatia) Marin Draganja / (Croatia) Mate Pavić
Yeongwol Challenger Tennis	· 2014 →

The 2013 Yeongwol Challenger Tennis was a professional tennis tournament played on carpet courts. It was the 1st edition of the tournament which was part of the 2013 ATP Challenger Tour. It took place in Yeongwol, South Korea between November 4 and 10, 2013.

== Singles main-draw entrants ==
=== Seeds ===
Country	Player	Rank^{1}	Seed
GER	Julian Reister	88	1
AUS	Matthew Ebden	98	2
SLO	Blaž Kavčič	106	3
USA	Bradley Klahn	123	4
SRB	Dušan Lajović	134	5
GBR	James Ward	160	6
BIH	Mirza Bašić	203	7
AUS	Matt Reid	229	8

- ^{1} Rankings are as of October 28, 2013.

=== Other entrants ===
The following players received wildcards into the singles main draw:

- (South Korea) Chung Hong
- (South Korea) Chung Hyeon
- (South Korea) Jeong Suk-young
- (South Korea) Nam Ji-sung

The following players used special exempt into the singles main draw:

- (United Kingdom) Brydan Klein

The following players used protected ranking into the singles main draw:

- (United States) Daniel Kosakowski

The following players received entry from the qualifying draw:

- (New Zealand) Marcus Daniell
- (United States) Jason Jung
- (United States) Daniel Nguyen
- (United Kingdom) Alexander Ward

== Champions ==
=== Singles ===
- (United States) Bradley Klahn def. (Japan) Taro Daniel 7–6^{(7–5)}, 6–2

=== Doubles ===
- (Croatia) Marin Draganja / (Croatia) Mate Pavić def. (Chinese Taipei) Lee Hsin-han / (Chinese Taipei) Peng Hsien-yin 6–4, 4–6, [10–7]
