= 2013 Levene Gouldin & Thompson Tennis Challenger – Singles =

Singles
- 2013 Levene Gouldin & Thompson Tennis Challenger

Final
- Champion: (United States) Alex Kuznetsov
- Runner-up: (United States) Bradley Klahn
- Score: 6–4, 3–6, 6–3

Events
| Singles | Doubles |
| ← 2012 · | Levene Gouldin & Thompson Tennis Challenger | · 2014 → |

Michael Yani was the defending champion but decided not to participate. Alex Kuznetsov won the title defeating Bradley Klahn in the final.

== Seeds ==
1. (United States) Rhyne Williams (semifinals)
2. (Germany) Mischa Zverev (quarterfinals)
3. (Japan) Yūichi Sugita (second round)
4. (United States) Donald Young (first round)
5. (United States) Bradley Klahn (final)
6. (United States) Alex Kuznetsov (champion)
7. (Tunisia) Malek Jaziri (second round)
8. (Uzbekistan) Farrukh Dustov (first round)

== Draw ==
=== Key ===
- Q = Qualifier
- WC = Wild card
- LL = Lucky loser
- Alt = Alternate
- SE = Special exempt
- PR = Protected ranking
- ITF = ITF entry
- JE = Junior exempt
- w/o = Walkover
- r = Retired
- d = Defaulted
- SR = Special ranking

=== Finals ===
Semifinals
1/WC | (United States) Rhyne Williams | 1 | 4
6 | (United States) Alex Kuznetsov | 6 | 6
5 | (United States) Bradley Klahn | 6 | 3 | 6
(United States) Austin Krajicek | 3 | 6 | 0

Final
6 | (United States) Alex Kuznetsov | 6 | 3 | 6
5 | (United States) Bradley Klahn | 4 | 6 | 3

=== Top half ===
First round
1/WC | (United States) R Williams | 7 | 7^{7}
(United States) N Meister | 5 | 6^{0}
(New Zealand) M Venus | 6 | 7
(South Africa) F Wolmarans | 3 | 5
WC | (United States) D Novikov | 6^{5} | 2
Q | (Zimbabwe) T Garanganga | 7^{7} | 6
Q | (Denmark) F Nielsen | 4 | 6 | 3
8 | (Uzbekistan) F Dustov | 6 | 3 | 0^{r}
4/WC | (United States) D Young | 7 | 5 | 2
(United States) T Sandgren | 5 | 7 | 6
(United States) C Buchanan | 2 | 7 | 1
(Serbia) I Bozoljac | 6 | 5 | 6
(United Kingdom) A Bogdanovic | 2 | 1
(Switzerland) S Bohli | 6 | 6
(United States) C Harrison | 6 | 2 | 3
6 | (United States) A Kuznetsov | 4 | 6 | 6

Second round
1/WC | (United States) R Williams | 7^{7} | 2 | 6
(New Zealand) M Venus | 6^{4} | 6 | 2
Q | (Zimbabwe) T Garanganga | 6 | 6
Q | (Denmark) F Nielsen | 2 | 4
(United States) T Sandgren | 3 | 7^{7} | 6
(Serbia) I Bozoljac | 6 | 6^{0} | 3
(Switzerland) S Bohli | 6 | r
6 | (United States) A Kuznetsov | 2

Quarterfinals
1/WC | (United States) R Williams | 6 | 4
Q | (Zimbabwe) T Garanganga | 3 | 3^{r}
(United States) T Sandgren | 4 | 5
6 | (United States) A Kuznetsov | 6 | 7

Semifinals
1/WC | (United States) R Williams | 1 | 4
6 | (United States) A Kuznetsov | 6 | 6

=== Bottom half ===
First round
5 | (United States) B Klahn | 6 | 6
(India) Y Bhambri | 3 | 3
Q | (United States) M Krueger | 6 | 6
(Australia) A Feeney | 4 | 4
(India) S Singh | 6 | 6
(Croatia) D Marcan | 4 | 4
Q | (United States) G Ouellette | 5 | 6^{3}
3 | (Japan) Y Sugita | 7 | 7^{7}
7 | (Tunisia) M Jaziri | 7 | 6
(India) S Myneni | 5 | 1
(United States) J Jenkins | 2 | 4
(United States) A Krajicek | 6 | 6
(Australia) G Jones | 2 | 7^{10} | 4
(Australia) J-P Smith | 6 | 6^{8} | 6
(India) P Amritraj | 2 | 2^{r}
2 | (Germany) M Zverev | 6 | 3

Second round
5 | (United States) B Klahn | 6 | 4 | 6
(United States) M Krueger | 3 | 6 | 2
(India) S Singh | 6 | 6
3 | (Japan) Y Sugita | 4 | 2
7 | (Tunisia) M Jaziri | 4 | 6 | 5
(United States) A Krajicek | 6 | 2 | 7
(Australia) J-P Smith | 4 | 6^{0}
2 | (Germany) M Zverev | 6 | 7^{7}

Quarterfinals
5 | (United States) B Klahn | 3 | 6 | 6
(India) S Singh | 6 | 1 | 2
(United States) A Krajicek | 6 | 3 | 6
2 | (Germany) M Zverev | 3 | 6 | 4

Semifinals
5 | (United States) B Klahn | 6 | 3 | 6
(United States) A Krajicek | 3 | 6 | 0
