= 2013 Levene Gouldin & Thompson Tennis Challenger – Doubles =

Doubles
- 2013 Levene Gouldin & Thompson Tennis Challenger

Final
- Champions: (United States) Bradley Klahn (New Zealand) Michael Venus
- Runners-up: (Australia) Adam Feeney (Australia) John-Patrick Smith
- Score: 6–3, 6–4

Events
Singles	Doubles
- Levene Gouldin & Thompson Tennis Challenger

Dudi Sela and Harel Srugo were the defending champions but decided not to participate.
Bradley Klahn and Michael Venus won the final against Adam Feeney and John-Patrick Smith 6–3, 6–4.

== Seeds ==
1. (Australia) Adam Feeney / (Australia) John-Patrick Smith (final)
2. (United States) Bradley Klahn / (New Zealand) Michael Venus (champions)
3. (Serbia) Ilija Bozoljac / (Germany) Mischa Zverev (quarterfinals)
4. (United States) Jarmere Jenkins / (United States) Austin Krajicek (semifinals)

== Draw ==
Key

- Q = Qualifier
- WC = Wild card
- LL = Lucky loser
- Alt = Alternate
- ITF = ITF entry
- PR = Protected ranking
- SR = Special ranking
- SE = Special exempt
- JE = Junior exempt
- JR = Junior Accelerator Programme entrant
- CO = College Accelerator Programme entrant
- NG = Next Gen Accelerator Program entrant
- w/o = Walkover
- r = Retired
- d = Defaulted

=== Draw ===
First round
1	(Australia) A Feeney (Australia) J-P Smith	6	6
(Australia) G Jones (United States) G Ouellette	1	2
WC	(Tunisia) Mohamed Haythem Abid (Tunisia) M Jaziri	6	6
(United States) B Fratangelo (United States) M Krueger	4	4
3	(Serbia) I Bozoljac (Germany) M Zverev	6	7^{7}
(Zimbabwe) T Garanganga (Japan) Y Sugita	2	6^{3}
WC	(United States) P Kobelt (United States) Mi Redlicki	6	1	[6]
(United States) J Dadamo (United States) N Meister	4	6	[10]
(United States) S Bangoura (United States) D Novikov	4	6^{6}
(India) Y Bhambri (India) S Singh	6	7^{8}
(United States) Ian Van Cott (United States) Alexander Van Cott	1	4
4	(United States) J Jenkins (United States) A Krajicek	6	6
Q	(Uzbekistan) Rifat Biktyakov (Uzbekistan) F Dustov	6^{4}	0
(United States) J Jung (United States) E King	7^{7}	6
(South Africa) R Roelofse (South Africa) F Wolmarans	4	5
2	(United States) B Klahn (New Zealand) M Venus	6	7

Quarterfinals
1	(Australia) A Feeney (Australia) J-P Smith	6	2	[10]
(Tunisia) MH Abid (Tunisia) M Jaziri	3	6	[4]
3	(Serbia) I Bozoljac (Germany) M Zverev	1	2
(United States) J Dadamo (United States) N Meister	6	6
(India) Y Bhambri (India) S Singh	3	6	[7]
4	(United States) J Jenkins (United States) A Krajicek	6	2	[10]
(United States) J Jung (United States) E King	3	5
2	(United States) B Klahn (New Zealand) M Venus	6	7

Semifinals
1	(Australia) A Feeney (Australia) J-P Smith	w/o
(United States) J Dadamo (United States) N Meister
4	(United States) J Jenkins (United States) A Krajicek	5	3
2	(United States) B Klahn (New Zealand) M Venus	7	6

Final
1	(Australia) A Feeney (Australia) J-P Smith	3	4
2	(United States) B Klahn (New Zealand) M Venus	6	7
