= 2019 Nielsen Pro Tennis Championship – Singles =

Singles
- 2019 Nielsen Pro Tennis Championship

Final
- Champion: (United States) Bradley Klahn
- Runner-up: (Australia) Jason Kubler
- Score: 6–2, 7–5

Events
Singles	Doubles
- Nielsen Pro Tennis Championship

Evgeny Karlovskiy was the defending champion but lost in the first round to Stefan Kozlov.

Bradley Klahn won the title after defeating Jason Kubler 6–2, 7–5 in the final.

== Seeds ==
All seeds receive a bye into the second round.

1. (United States) Bradley Klahn (champion)
2. (Australia) Matthew Ebden (second round, retired)
3. (Argentina) Guido Andreozzi (third round, retired)
4. (Uzbekistan) Denis Istomin (semifinals)
5. (Chinese Taipei) Jason Jung (quarterfinals)
6. (United States) Bjorn Fratangelo (quarterfinals)
7. (Spain) Adrián Menéndez Maceiras (second round, retired)
8. (India) Ramkumar Ramanathan (quarterfinals)
9. (United States) Michael Mmoh (second round)
10. (France) Quentin Halys (second round)
11. (United States) Mitchell Krueger (second round)
12. (Australia) Jason Kubler (final)
13. (Australia) Thanasi Kokkinakis (semifinals, withdrew)
14. (United States) Christopher Eubanks (quarterfinals)
15. (United States) Donald Young (third round)
16. (United States) Thai-Son Kwiatkowski (second round)

== Draw ==
Key

- Q = Qualifier
- WC = Wild card
- LL = Lucky loser
- Alt = Alternate
- ITF = ITF entry
- PR = Protected ranking
- SR = Special ranking
- SE = Special exempt
- JE = Junior exempt
- JR = Junior Accelerator Programme entrant
- CO = College Accelerator Programme entrant
- NG = Next Gen Accelerator Program entrant
- w/o = Walkover
- r = Retired
- d = Defaulted

=== Finals ===
Quarterfinals
1	(United States) Bradley Klahn	6	7^{7}
6/WC	(United States) Bjorn Fratangelo	4	6^{3}
4/WC	(Uzbekistan) Denis Istomin	6	7
8	(India) Ramkumar Ramanathan	2	5
5	(Chinese Taipei) Jason Jung	6^{4}	1
13	(Australia) Thanasi Kokkinakis	7^{7}	6
12	(Australia) Jason Kubler	6	6
14	(United States) Christopher Eubanks	4	3

Semifinals
1	(United States) Bradley Klahn	6	6
4/WC	(Uzbekistan) Denis Istomin	2	3
13	(Australia) Thanasi Kokkinakis
12	(Australia) Jason Kubler	w/o

Final
1	(United States) Bradley Klahn	6	7
12	(Australia) Jason Kubler	2	5

=== Top half ===
==== Section 1 ====
First round
WC	(United States) A Rybakov	6^{3}	3
(Australia) M Purcell	7^{7}	6
ITF	(United States) S Bangoura	7	6
(United States) R Shane	5	3
(United States) R Sarmiento	7^{7}	4	0
(United States) Roy Smith	6^{3}	6	6
(United States) U Blanch	6	7^{7}
WC	(United States) S Dostanic	2	6^{4}

Second round
1	(United States) B Klahn	7	6
(Australia) M Purcell	5	3
ITF	(United States) S Bangoura	3	4
15	(United States) D Young	6	6
9	(United States) M Mmoh	4	4
(United States) R Smith	6	6
(United States) U Blanch	6^{2}	6	0^{r}
6/WC	(United States) B Fratangelo	7^{7}	4	2

Third round
1	(United States) B Klahn	6	6
15	(United States) D Young	1	3
(United States) R Smith	3	3
6/WC	(United States) B Fratangelo	6	6

Quarterfinals
1	(United States) B Klahn	6	7^{7}
6/WC	(United States) B Fratangelo	4	6^{3}

==== Section 2 ====
First round
(United States) A Sarkissian	2	2
ITF	(Tunisia) A Dougaz	6	6
(United States) C Altamirano	6	4	6
ITF	(United States) Ma Redlicki	2	6	4
(Russia) T Gabashvili	3	0
(United States) JC Aragone	6	6
(United States) Mi Redlicki	7	6
(United States) E King	5	4

Second round
4/WC	(Uzbekistan) D Istomin	6	3	6
ITF	(Tunisia) A Dougaz	3	6	3
(United States) C Altamirano	6	6
16	(United States) T-S Kwiatkowski	3	0
11	(United States) M Krueger	6	6^{2}	6^{3}
(United States) JC Aragone	2	7^{7}	7^{7}
(United States) Mi Redlicki	5	5
8	(India) R Ramanathan	7	7

Third round
4/WC	(Uzbekistan) D Istomin	6	6
(United States) C Altamirano	3	0
(United States) JC Aragone	6^{6}	3
8	(India) R Ramanathan	7^{8}	6

Quarterfinals
4/WC	(Uzbekistan) D Istomin	6	7
8	(India) R Ramanathan	2	5

=== Bottom half ===
==== Section 3 ====
First round
ITF	(United States) Jordi Arconada	3	4
PR	(Austria) M Neuchrist	6	6
Q	(United States) Felix Corwin	1	3
ITF	(Greece) M Pervolarakis	6	6
(United States) K King	3	3
(Colombia) A González	6	6
Q	(United States) J McNally	6	4	6
WC	(United States) S Riffice	4	6	4

Second round
5	(Chinese Taipei) J Jung	6	6
PR	(Austria) M Neuchrist	2	2
ITF	(Greece) M Pervolarakis	7^{7}	7^{8}
10	(France) Q Halys	6^{3}	6^{6}
13	(Australia) T Kokkinakis	6	6
(Colombia) A González	4	3
Q	(United States) J McNally	5	1
3	(Argentina) G Andreozzi	7	6

Third round
5	(Chinese Taipei) J Jung	6	6
ITF	(Greece) M Pervolarakis	2	4
13	(Australia) T Kokkinakis	7^{7}	4
3	(Argentina) G Andreozzi	6^{5}	0^{r}

Quarterfinals
5	(Chinese Taipei) J Jung	6^{4}	1
13	(Australia) T Kokkinakis	7^{7}	6

==== Section 4 ====
First round
(United States) S Kozlov	6	6
(Russia) E Karlovskiy	2	4
(Australia) L Saville	6	3	6^{3}
(Australia) A Vukic	3	6	7^{7}
(United States) Jared Hiltzik	6	3	6
(United States) T Smyczek	2	6	3
(India) S Mukund	4	4
(United States) E Escobedo	6	6

Second round
7	(Spain) A Menéndez Maceiras	5	0^{r}
(United States) S Kozlov	7	4
(Australia) A Vukic	3	2
12	(Australia) J Kubler	6	6
14	(United States) C Eubanks	6	6
(United States) J Hiltzik	3	3
(United States) E Escobedo	5
2	(Australia) M Ebden	0^{r}

Third round
(United States) S Kozlov	2	3
12	(Australia) J Kubler	6	6
14	(United States) C Eubanks	7^{7}	6
(United States) E Escobedo	6^{2}	4

Quarterfinals
12	(Australia) J Kubler	6	6
14	(United States) C Eubanks	4	3
