= 2013 Traralgon Challenger – Singles =

Singles
- 2013 Traralgon Challenger

Final
- Champion: (India) Yuki Bhambri
- Runner-up: (United States) Bradley Klahn
- Score: 6–7^{(13–15)}, 6–3, 6–4

Events
Singles	Doubles
Traralgon Challenger	· 2014 →

This was the first edition of the event. Yuki Bhambri won, defeating runner-up Bradley Klahn.

== Seeds ==
1. (United States) Bradley Klahn (final)
2. (Australia) James Duckworth (semifinals)
3. (United Kingdom) James Ward (first round)
4. (Japan) Tatsuma Ito (quarterfinals)
5. (Australia) Greg Jones (withdrew)
6. (Australia) Matt Reid (second round)
7. (Australia) Benjamin Mitchell (quarterfinals)
8. (India) Yuki Bhambri (champion)
9. (New Zealand) José Statham (first round)

== Draw ==
=== Key ===
- Q = Qualifier
- WC = Wild card
- LL = Lucky loser
- Alt = Alternate
- SE = Special exempt
- PR = Protected ranking
- ITF = ITF entry
- JE = Junior exempt
- w/o = Walkover
- r = Retired
- d = Defaulted
- SR = Special ranking

=== Finals ===
Semifinals
1	(United States) Bradley Klahn	6	6
(United Kingdom) Brydan Klein	1	4
8	(India) Yuki Bhambri	6	6
2	(Australia) James Duckworth	2	4

Final
1	(United States) Bradley Klahn	7^{15}	3	4
8	(India) Yuki Bhambri	6^{13}	6	6

=== Top half ===
First round
1	(United States) B Klahn	6	6
(Australia) A Whittington	4	1
WC	(Australia) M Banes	5	4
(United States) M Krueger	7	6
(Thailand) D Udomchoke	6	1	6
(Australia) R Agar	2	6	3
WC	(Australia) B Mott	4	3
6	(Australia) M Reid	6	6
3	(United Kingdom) J Ward	6^{6}	4
(Australia) C Guccione	7^{7}	6
(Australia) A Feeney	4	4
Q	(Japan) Bumpei Sato	6	6
(United Kingdom) B Klein	7^{7}	6
WC	(Australia) Gavin van Peperzeel	6^{5}	4
(Australia) J Thompson	7^{7}	7^{7}
9	(New Zealand) J Statham	6^{5}	6^{4}

Second round
1	(United States) B Klahn	4	6	6
(United States) M Krueger	6	4	3
(Thailand) D Udomchoke	7^{7}	6
6	(Australia) M Reid	6^{4}	4
(Australia) C Guccione	w/o
Q	(Japan) B Sato
(United Kingdom) B Klein	6	7
(Australia) J Thompson	4	5

Quarterfinals
1	(United States) B Klahn	6	7^{7}
(Thailand) D Udomchoke	3	6^{3}
Q	(Japan) B Sato	2	6	4
(United Kingdom) B Klein	6	3	6

Semifinals
1	(United States) B Klahn	6	6
(United Kingdom) B Klein	1	4

=== Bottom half ===
First round
8	(India) Y Bhambri	6	1
Q	(Australia) Brendon Moore	2	0^{r}
(New Zealand) M Venus	6	6
(Australia) D Propoggia	3	3
(France) J Dasnières de Veigy	6^{3}	3
(Australia) L Saville	7^{7}	6
(Japan) K Takeuchi	3	2
4	(Japan) T Ito	6	6
7	(Australia) B Mitchell	6	6
(Australia) A Bolt	4	3
WC	(Australia) Darren K. Polkinghorne	6	6
Q	(Australia) Richard Yang	2	3
(Australia) T Kokkinakis	6	6
LL	(Australia) Chanchai Sookton-Eng	3	1
Q	(United States) Sean Berman	3	4
2	(Australia) J Duckworth	6	6

Second round
8	(India) Y Bhambri	1	6	7^{7}
(New Zealand) M Venus	6	3	6^{4}
(Australia) L Saville	3	2
4	(Japan) T Ito	6	6
7	(Australia) B Mitchell	6	6
WC	(Australia) D Polkinghorne	2	2
(Australia) T Kokkinakis	3	4
2	(Australia) J Duckworth	6	6

Quarterfinals
8	(India) Y Bhambri	6	1	7
4	(Japan) T Ito	4	6	5
7	(Australia) B Mitchell	2	5
2	(Australia) J Duckworth	6	7

Semifinals
8	(India) Y Bhambri	6	6
2	(Australia) J Duckworth	2	4
