= 2019 Nielsen Pro Tennis Championship – Doubles =

Doubles
- 2019 Nielsen Pro Tennis Championship

Final
- Champions: (United States) JC Aragone (United States) Bradley Klahn
- Runners-up: (United States) Christopher Eubanks (United States) Thai-Son Kwiatkowski
- Score: 7–5, 6–4

Events
Singles	Doubles
- Nielsen Pro Tennis Championship

Austin Krajicek and Jeevan Nedunchezhiyan were the defending champions but only Nedunchezhiyan chose to defend his title, partnering Purav Raja. Nedunchezhiyan lost in the first round to Jason Jung and Evan King.

JC Aragone and Bradley Klahn won the title after defeating Christopher Eubanks and Thai-Son Kwiatkowski 7–5, 6–4 in the final.

== Seeds ==
1. (India) Jeevan Nedunchezhiyan / (India) Purav Raja (first round)
2. (Australia) Max Purcell / (Australia) Luke Saville (quarterfinals, withdrew)
3. (Venezuela) Roberto Maytín / (United States) Jackson Withrow (first round)
4. (France) Quentin Halys / (India) Ramkumar Ramanathan (first round, retired)

== Draw ==
Key

- Q = Qualifier
- WC = Wild card
- LL = Lucky loser
- Alt = Alternate
- ITF = ITF entry
- PR = Protected ranking
- SR = Special ranking
- SE = Special exempt
- JE = Junior exempt
- JR = Junior Accelerator Programme entrant
- CO = College Accelerator Programme entrant
- NG = Next Gen Accelerator Program entrant
- w/o = Walkover
- r = Retired
- d = Defaulted

First round
1	(India) J Nedunchezhiyan (India) P Raja	5	4
(Chinese Taipei) J Jung (United States) E King	7	6
WC	(United States) T Fawcett (United States) A Reed	6	7^{7}
(Colombia) A González (Spain) A Menéndez Maceiras	2	6^{2}
4	(France) Q Halys (India) R Ramanathan	0^{r}
(United States) JC Aragone (United States) B Klahn	0
WC	(United States) K King (United States) A Lawson	4	6	[9]
ITF	(United States) Jordi Arconada (Tunisia) A Dougaz	6	3	[11]
(United States) B Fratangelo (United States) M Krueger	6	3	[11]
ITF	(United States) S Bangoura (Greece) M Pervolarakis	4	6	[9]
(Uzbekistan) D Istomin (Russia) E Karlovskiy	6	4	[10]
3	(Venezuela) R Maytín (United States) J Withrow	1	6	[2]
Alt	(United States) Roy Smith (Ukraine) V Uzhylovskyi	6^{6}	4
(United States) C Eubanks (United States) T-S Kwiatkowski	7^{8}	6
WC	(United States) Aron Hiltzik (United States) Jared Hiltzik	2	3
2	(Australia) M Purcell (Australia) L Saville	6	6

Quarterfinals
(Chinese Taipei) J Jung (United States) E King	6	6
WC	(United States) T Fawcett (United States) A Reed	4	4
(United States) JC Aragone (United States) B Klahn	6	6
ITF	(United States) J Arconada (Tunisia) A Dougaz	4	4
(United States) B Fratangelo (United States) M Krueger
(Uzbekistan) D Istomin (Russia) E Karlovskiy	w/o
(United States) C Eubanks (United States) T-S Kwiatkowski	w/o
2	(Australia) M Purcell (Australia) L Saville

Semifinals
(Chinese Taipei) J Jung (United States) E King
(United States) JC Aragone (United States) B Klahn	w/o
(Uzbekistan) D Istomin (Russia) E Karlovskiy
(United States) C Eubanks (United States) T-S Kwiatkowski	w/o

Final
(United States) JC Aragone (United States) B Klahn	7	6
(United States) C Eubanks (United States) T-S Kwiatkowski	5	4
