= 2012 Levene Gouldin & Thompson Tennis Challenger – Singles =

Singles
- 2012 Levene Gouldin & Thompson Tennis Challenger

Final
- Champion: (United States) Michael Yani
- Runner-up: (South Africa) Fritz Wolmarans
- Score: 6–4, 7–6^{(13–11)}

Events
Singles	Doubles
- Levene Gouldin & Thompson Tennis Challenger

Paul Capdeville was the defending champion but decided not to participate.
Michael Yani won the final 6–4, 7–6^{(13–11)} against Fritz Wolmarans.

== Seeds ==
1. (Israel) Dudi Sela (first round)
2. (Switzerland) Marco Chiudinelli (first round)
3. (South Africa) Izak van der Merwe (first round)
4. (Lithuania) Laurynas Grigelis (first round)
5. (United States) Robby Ginepri (second round)
6. (United Kingdom) Jamie Baker (quarterfinals)
7. (United States) Denis Kudla (first round)
8. (France) Adrian Mannarino (second round)

== Draw ==
Key

- Q = Qualifier
- WC = Wild card
- LL = Lucky loser
- Alt = Alternate
- ITF = ITF entry
- PR = Protected ranking
- SR = Special ranking
- SE = Special exempt
- JE = Junior exempt
- JR = Junior Accelerator Programme entrant
- CO = College Accelerator Programme entrant
- NG = Next Gen Accelerator Program entrant
- w/o = Walkover
- r = Retired
- d = Defaulted

=== Finals ===
Semifinals
(New Zealand) Daniel King-Turner	5	4
(United States) Michael Yani	7	6
Q	(South Africa) Fritz Wolmarans	6	7
(Switzerland) Adrien Bossel	4	5

Final
(United States) Michael Yani	6	7^{13}
Q	(South Africa) Fritz Wolmarans	4	6^{11}

=== Top half ===
First round
1	(Israel) D Sela	2	7	6^{8}
(United States) R Williams	6	5	7^{10}
Q	(United States) Mitchell Frank	6	7^{7}
(United States) B Fratangelo	3	6^{4}
(Mexico) M Gallardo Valles	7^{7}	4	6^{1}
(New Zealand) D King-Turner	6^{4}	6	7^{7}
Q	(New Zealand) M Venus	2	2
5/WC	(United States) R Ginepri	6	6
3	(South Africa) I van der Merwe	6^{3}	1
(United Kingdom) A Bogdanovic	7^{7}	6
(United States) M Yani	6	7^{7}
(United States) A Krajicek	3	6^{3}
(United States) C Harrison	6^{2}	6	7
(United States) T Sandgren	7^{7}	1	5
LL	(United States) M Sykut	5	3
6	(United Kingdom) J Baker	7	6

Second round
(United States) R Williams	6	6
Q	(United States) Mitchell Frank	2	2
(New Zealand) D King-Turner	6^{2}	6	6
5/WC	(United States) R Ginepri	7^{7}	4	4
(United Kingdom) A Bogdanovic	3	4
(United States) M Yani	6	6
(United States) C Harrison	5	7^{7}	2
6	(United Kingdom) J Baker	7	6^{3}	6

Quarterfinals
(United States) R Williams	4	6^{3}
(New Zealand) D King-Turner	6	7^{7}
(United States) M Yani	6	6
6	(United Kingdom) J Baker	0	4

Semifinals
(New Zealand) D King-Turner	5	4
(United States) M Yani	7	6

=== Bottom half ===
First round
7	(United States) D Kudla	4	6^{3}
(United States) B Klahn	6	7^{7}
Q	(South Africa) F Wolmarans	6	6
WC	(United States) Mitchell Krueger	3	2
(Croatia) Ante Pavić	6	2	3
Q	(United States) Andrew Carter	2	6	6
(United States) Greg Ouellette	5	6	6
4	(Lithuania) L Grigelis	7	0	4
8	(France) A Mannarino	7^{7}	3	6
(United States) J Dadamo	6^{4}	6	2
(Australia) C Guccione	6^{5}	5
(Switzerland) Adrien Bossel	7^{7}	7
(France) G Sakharov	6^{3}	4
(Australia) G Jones	7^{7}	6
(United States) M McClune	7	3	7^{7}
2	(Switzerland) M Chiudinelli	5	6	6^{5}

Second round
(United States) B Klahn	6^{4}	3
Q	(South Africa) F Wolmarans	7^{7}	6
Q	(United States) Andrew Carter	4	2
(United States) Greg Ouellette	6	6
8	(France) A Mannarino	6	6^{5}	6^{4}
(Switzerland) Adrien Bossel	4	7^{7}	7^{7}
(Australia) G Jones	4	7^{7}	3
(United States) M McClune	6	6^{5}	6

Quarterfinals
Q	(South Africa) F Wolmarans	6	6
(United States) Greg Ouellette	1	4
(Switzerland) Adrien Bossel	7^{7}	7^{7}
(United States) M McClune	6^{4}	6^{5}

Semifinals
Q	(South Africa) F Wolmarans	6	7
(Switzerland) Adrien Bossel	4	5
