= Yeongwol Challenger Tennis =

- 2013 Yeongwol Challenger Tennis

ATP Challenger Tour
- Event name: Yeongwol
- Location: Yeongwol County, South Korea
- Venue: Sports Park Tennis Court
- Category: ATP Challenger Tour
- Surface: Hard
- Draw: 32S/32Q/16D
- Prize money: $35,000+H

Yeongwol Challenger Tennis was a professional tennis tournament played on outdoor hardcourts in Yeongwol County, South Korea. The first event was held in November 2013. Although the actual prize money is $35,000, the tournament belonged to the category of $50,000 and the ranking points were 80 for the winner, and 48 for the runner-up.

== Past finals ==
=== Men's singles ===
Year	Champion	Runner-up	Score
2013	(United States) Bradley Klahn	(Japan) Taro Daniel	7–6^{(7–5)}, 6–2

=== Men's doubles ===
Year	Champions	Runners-up	Score
2013	(Croatia) Marin Draganja (Croatia) Mate Pavić	(Chinese Taipei) Lee Hsin-han (Chinese Taipei) Peng Hsien-yin	6–4, 4–6, [10–7]
