= Harel Srugo =

Israeli tennis player

- Native name: הראל סרוגו
- Country (sports): Israel
- Residence: Israel
- Born: 15 March 1982 (age 43); Israel
- Turned pro: 2000
- Plays: Right-handed
- Prize money: US$10,689

Singles
- Career record: 0–0 (in ATP World Tour and Grand Slam main draw matches, and in Davis Cup)
- Career titles: 0 (ATP World Tour and Grand Slam)
- Highest ranking: No. 703 (8 April 2002)
- Current ranking: No. 1006 (6 May 2012)

Doubles
- Career record: 0–0 (in ATP World Tour and Grand Slam main draw matches, and in Davis Cup)
- Career titles: 0 (ATP World Tour and Grand Slam)
- Highest ranking: No. 460 (23 February 2004)
- Current ranking: No. 490 (6 May 2012)
- Last updated on: 2 September 2012.

Harel Srugo (Hebrew: הראל סרוגו; born 15 March 1982) is an Israeli professional tennis player and competes mainly on the ATP Challenger Tour and ITF Futures, both in singles and doubles.

Srugo reached his highest ATP singles ranking, No. 703 on 8 April 2002, and his highest ATP doubles ranking, No. 460, on 23 February 2004.

== ATP career finals (1) ==
=== Doubles (1) ===
Legend
ATP Challengers (1)

Finals by surface
Hard (1–0)
Clay (0–0)
Grass (0–0)
Carpet (0–0)

Outcome	No.	Date	Tournament	Surface	Partnering	Opponents in the final	Score
Winners	1.	22 July 2012	Binghamton, United States	Hard	(Israel) Dudi Sela	(Switzerland) Adrien Bossel (United States) Michael McClune	6–2, 3–6, [10–8]
