= Bradley Klahn =

American tennis player

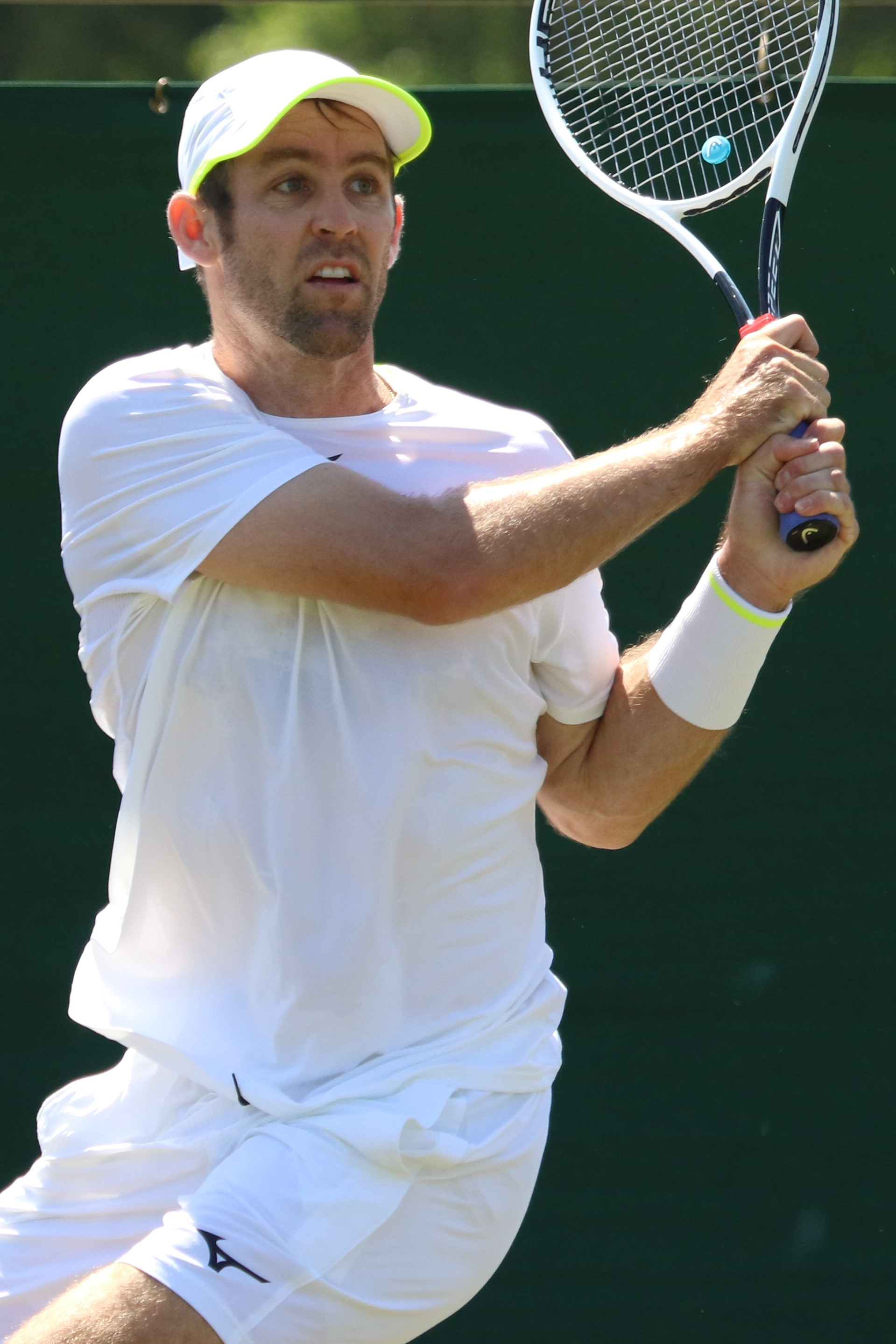
- Klahn at the 2022 Wimbledon Championships
- Country (sports): United States
- Residence: Poway, California
- Born: August 20, 1990 (age 35) Poway, California
- Height: 1.83 m (6 ft 0 in)
- Turned pro: 2012
- Retired: 2023
- Plays: Left-handed (two-handed backhand)
- College: Stanford
- Prize money: $ 1,764,256

Singles
- Career record: 13–43
- Career titles: 0
- Highest ranking: No. 63 (17 March 2014)

Grand Slam singles results
- Australian Open: 1R (2014, 2019)
- French Open: 1R (2014, 2019)
- Wimbledon: 2R (2018)
- US Open: 2R (2012, 2013, 2019)

Doubles
- Career record: 8–16
- Career titles: 0
- Highest ranking: No. 131 (3 March 2014)

Grand Slam doubles results
- Australian Open: 1R (2019)
- French Open: 1R (2014)
- Wimbledon: 1R (2014)
- US Open: 3R (2014)

Grand Slam mixed doubles results
- US Open: 1R (2012, 2017, 2022)
- Last updated on: 18 September 2023.

Bradley Klahn (born August 20, 1990) is an American former professional tennis player from Poway, California.

Klahn played collegiate tennis at Stanford University, where he won the 2010 NCAA Singles Championships as a sophomore. His next year as a junior, he was a finalist in the NCAA Doubles Championship. He played at the 2010 US Open, taking a set from 20th seed Sam Querrey before being defeated in four sets. Klahn received a wild card into the 2011 SAP Open. He underwent back surgery in February 2015 and did not resume playing until late 2016, accepting a wild card into qualifying for the Challenger event in Champaign-Urbana and winning three matches to reach the main draw, where he defeated Sam Groth in the first round and Tennys Sandgren in the second before falling to Jared Donaldson in the quarterfinals.

== Personal life ==
Klahn began playing tennis at age 11 after his mother, Nancy, who played tennis at University of Iowa, signed him up for a summer round-robin league. His father Dennis is a group controller. His younger sister Kathryn and younger brother Brian were both students at Santa Clara University. He grew up in Poway, California, 22 miles northeast of San Diego, and admired countrymen Pete Sampras, Andre Agassi and Andy Roddick.

== Career ==
=== Juniors ===
Achieved his top USTA Boys' 18s ranking of No. 1 in 2008. He had a career-high ranking in the International Tennis Federation was No. 14 and he reached the third round of the 2008 Junior Australian Open, Junior Wimbledon Championships, and Junior U.S. Open. He captured both the singles and doubles B18s titles at the 2008 USTA International Spring Championships and 2008 Winter Nationals and the doubles title at Melbourne's Optus Nottinghill ITF Championships. Klahn was a finalist at the 2008 Kalamazoo B18s doubles and the Optus Nottinghill ITF B18s singles. He won the 2006 USTA Nationals (Kalamazoo) B16s doubles and was a member of the Junior Davis Cup squad that competed in Barcelona that same year.

=== 2008–09 ===
Bradley went to Stanford and was the ITA National Rookie of the Year, Pac-10 Freshman of the Year and an All-Pac-10 First Team selection. Klahn became just the fourth player in school history to claim both the Pac-10 Singles and Doubles Championships in the same year. He led team with an overall record of 35–9, playing mainly at the top two spots of the lineup. He had the team-best 20–5 in dual matches with a 7–1 mark at the No.1 position and 13–4 record at the No. 2 spot. He went 19–8 against nationally ranked opponents and finished with a national ranking of No. 32. He had two different 10-match winning streaks on the year, including a season-best 11-match winning streak from Apr 8 to May 8. His highest-ranked victory was a 6–2, 7–5 win over No. 7 Robert Farah of USC on Apr 25. Klahn claimed the Pac-10 singles title with five consecutive straight-set victories but dropped a hard-fought, three-set decision to teammate Alex Clayton in the final of the ITA Regional Championship. In his first career match, picked up a 6–4, 6–4 win against Kentucky's Brad Cox at the ITA All-American Championships. In double he teamed up with Ryan Thacher for a final No. 28 national ranking and an 11–4 record (7–4 duals). The duo also claimed its first title, winning the Pac-10 doubles crown. advanced to the round of 32 at the ITA All-American Championships and advanced to the doubles semifinals of the ITA Regional Championships with Clayton.

=== 2009–10 ===
He was an All-American in singles and doubles, All-Pac-10 First Team selection, Pac-10 All-Academic Honorable Mention, Klahn defeated Louisville's Austen Childs 6–1, 6–2 to become NCAA Singles champion, capturing Stanford's 14th collegiate singles title and first since 2000. He almost captured the NCAA Doubles crown as well, advancing to the semifinals. He finished season with a national singles ranking of No. 4. He reached the national title match after knocking off the tournament's top seed and country's No. 2-ranked player in Henrique Cunha of Duke 6–2, 6–2. He notched two different season-best nine-match winning streaks and led team in victories with a 41–8 overall record while also going 17–5 in duals and playing all his matches at the No. 1 position. Klahn was 23–8 against nationally ranked opponents, 15–6 against Pac-10 foes, 12–2 in home matches and 7–4 in three-set matches. He posted a 3–2 mark against players ranked in the top-10 at the time of the match. Klahn opened the year by winning 18 of his first 20 matches. He partnered exclusively with Ryan Thacher in doubles and the duo finished 40–8 overall, 17–3 in duals, 14–5 against Pac-10 opponents, 13–6 against nationally ranked foes and 11–0 in home matches. The dominant pairing claimed two doubles titles on the year, taking home the hardware at the ITA Northwest Regional Championships and ITA National Indoor Championships.

=== 2010–11 ===
He was again an All-American in singles and doubles, All-Pac-10 First Team honoree and Pac-10 All-Academic Honorable Mention selection. he advanced to quarterfinals of NCAA Singles Championship and earned a final national singles ranking of No. 6. He also led team with a 36–11 overall record. He was 24–9 against nationally ranked opponents with his highest-ranked victory was a 6–4, 6–2 rout of No. 5 Michael Shabaz from Virginia in the NCAA Tournament team portion. He reached the semifinals of the D'Novo/ITA All-American Championships and captured the singles title at the Sherwood Cup, repeating as the tourney champion. He finished runner-up finish at the Pac-10 Championships. In doubles again he partnered exclusively with Ryan Thacher for team-best records overall (43–8) and in duals (19–3), while finishing 16–7 against nationally ranked foes. Klahn and Thacher earned a final national doubles ranking of No. 4. They were named Pac-10 Doubles Team of the Year and were runner-up finish at NCAA Doubles Championships. They were the first Stanford doubles team to reach NCAA Doubles Championships final since 2004. He pocketed three tournament doubles titles during the year (Pacific Coast Doubles, Sherwood Cup and ITA National Indoor Championships consolation).

=== 2011–12 ===
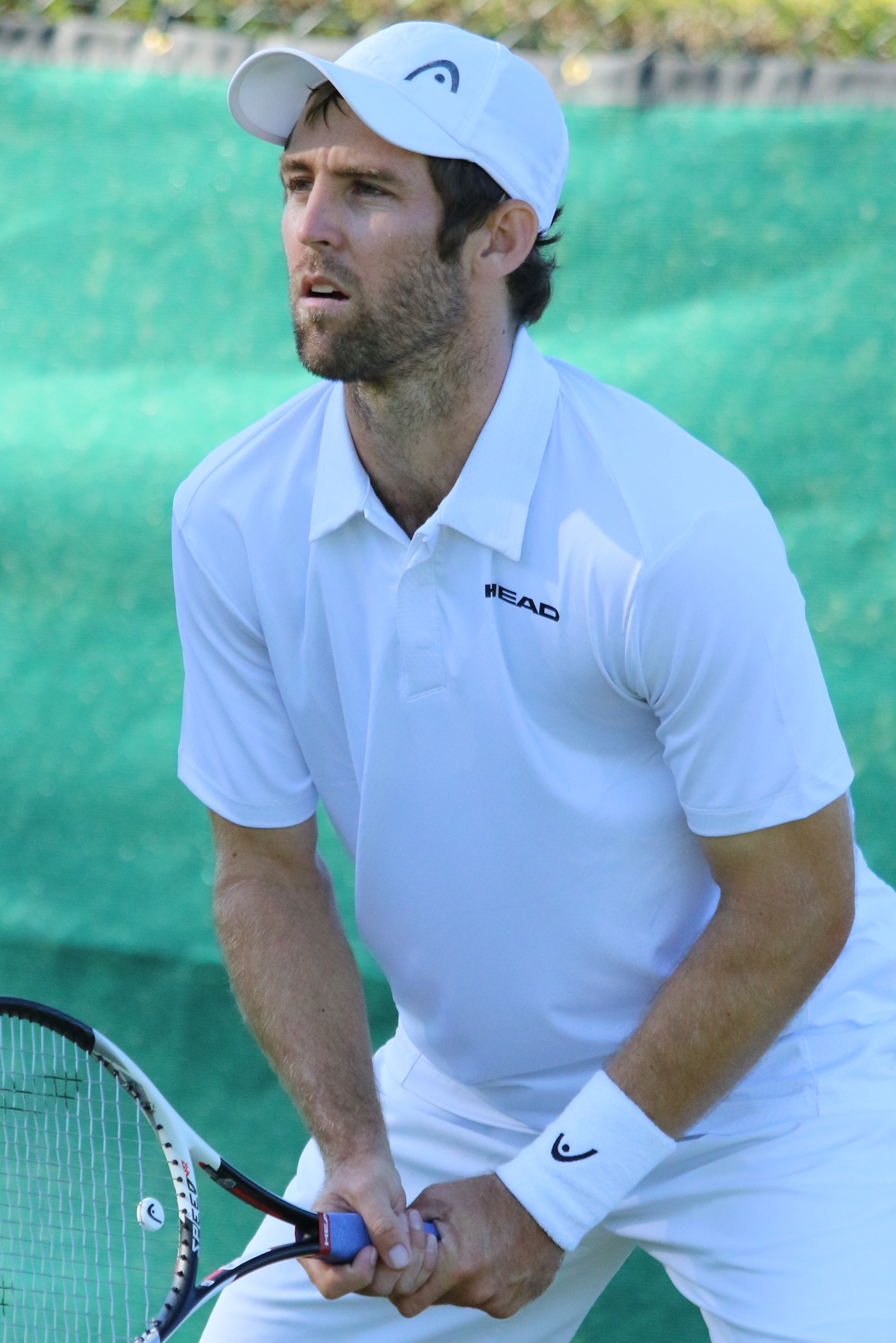
Klahn at the 2018 Wimbledon Championships

He was an ITA Scholar Athlete and All-American in both singles and doubles. As well as an All-Pac-12 First Team selection, Pac-12 All-Academic Honorable Mention selection and reached semifinals of the NCAA Singles Championship. He went 18–6 overall in singles and 14–5 in duals. He played mainly at the No. 1 spot He earned a final No. 12 in the national singles ranking and was 11–6 against nationally ranked opponents, 4–1 in tournament matches and 6–1 against conference The highest-ranked opponent he defeated was No. 3 Eric Quigley of Kentucky, prevailing 6–1, 6–2 in the NCAA Championships round of 16. He went 8–2 over his final 10 matches of the year in singles and in doubles with Ryan Thacher, compiled a 19–3 record overall and was 11–2 in duals. The duo earned a final No. 9 national ranking and advanced to quarterfinals of the NCAA Doubles Championships. Klahn and Thacher won the Pacific Coast Doubles crown in March, defending last year's title and earning seventh career doubles championship. They were the first tandem to capture back-to-back titles at the historic tournament since former Stanford standouts Jared Palmer and Jonathan Stark accomplished the feat in 1990–91.

=== 2013: Top 100 debut ===
The American finished in Top 100 for 1st time in his career after posting a 40–17 record in Challengers and winning 2 titles in 5 finals. Also 11–2 in Futures with 1 title. He was the youngest of 6 Americans in year-end Top 100. He won 1st Challenger title at Aptos (d. Evans) in August and won 2nd at Yeongwol, South Korea (d. Daniel) in November. Klahn also reached back-to-back finals at Winnetka (l. to Sock) and Binghamton (l. to Kuznetsov) in July, and reached final at Traralgon, Australia (l. to Bhambri) in October...He then reached back-to-back Futures finals in March, winning 1st career Futures title at U.S.A. #8 (d. Cho) and the week before at U.S.A. #7 (l. to Singh).

In Grand Slam play Klan went 1–1, reached 2R at US Open for 2nd year in a row (l. to Lopez), fell in qualifying at Australian Open (l. to Berankis in Q2), Roland Garros (l. to Velotti in Q1) and Wimbledon (l. to Peliwo in Q1) He compiled records of 1–2 on hard, 0–1 on clay and earned a career-high $153,368.

=== 2022–2023: Comeback from surgery, retirement ===
He came back in 2022 after a year and a half absence following a back surgery in December 2020. His first tournament in singles was at the 2022 French Open qualifying where he used his protected ranking. His first tournament back in doubles was the 2022 San Diego Open in September where he participated in singles in qualifying using a protected ranking and in doubles as a wildcard reaching the semifinals with Fernando Verdasco.

In August 2023, Klahn made his final professional appearance at the 2023 Golden Gate Open.

== Challenger and Futures finals ==
=== Singles: 18 (9–9) ===
Legend ATP Challenger Tour (8–6) ITF Futures Tour (1–3)	Finals by surface Hard (9–9) Clay (0–0) Grass (0–0)

Result	W–L	Date	Tournament	Tier	Surface	Opponent	Score
Loss	0–1	Sep 2009	USA F22, Claremont	Futures	Hard	(United States) Matt Bocko	6–7^{(4–7)}, 3–6
Loss	0–2	Mar 2013	USA F7, Calabasas	Futures	Hard	(India) Sanam Singh	3–6, 6–1, 6–7^{(3–7)}
Win	1–2	Mar 2013	USA F8, Costa Mesa	Futures	Hard	(South Korea) Cho Min-hyeok	6–3, 6–3
Loss	1–3	Jul 2013	Winnetka, US	Challenger	Hard	(United States) Jack Sock	4–6, 2–6
Loss	1–4	Jul 2013	Binghamton, US	Challenger	Hard	(United States) Alex Kuznetsov	4–6, 6–3, 3–6
Win	2–4	Aug 2013	Aptos, US	Challenger	Hard	(United Kingdom) Dan Evans	3–6, 7–6^{(7–5)}, 6–4
Loss	2–5	Nov 2013	Traralgon, Australia	Challenger	Hard	(India) Yuki Bhambri	7–6^{(15–13)}, 3–6, 4–6
Win	3–5	Nov 2013	Yeongwol, South Korea	Challenger	Hard	(Japan) Taro Daniel	7–6^{(7–5)}, 6–2
Win	4–5	Jan 2014	Maui, US	Challenger	Hard	(Chinese Taipei) Yang Tsung-hua	6–2, 6–3
Win	5–5	Feb 2014	West Lakes, Australia	Challenger	Hard	(Japan) Tatsuma Ito	6–3, 7–6^{(11–9)}
Win	6–5	Nov 2014	Traralgon, Australia	Challenger	Hard	(United States) Jarmere Jenkins	7–6^{(7–5)}, 6–1
Loss	6–6	Mar 2017	USA F11, Calabasas	Futures	Hard	(Germany) Sebastian Fanselow	3–6, 2–6
Loss	6–7	Oct 2017	Monterrey, Mexico	Challenger	Hard	(Germany) Maximilian Marterer	6–7^{(3–7)}, 6–7^{(6–8)}
Loss	6–8	Oct 2017	Fairfield, US	Challenger	Hard	(United States) Mackenzie McDonald	4–6, 2–6
Loss	6–9	Jan 2018	Newport Beach, US	Challenger	Hard	(United States) Taylor Fritz	6–3, 5–7, 0–6
Win	7–9	Jul 2018	Gatineau, Canada	Challenger	Hard	(France) Ugo Humbert	6–3, 7–6^{(7–5)}
Win	8–9	Nov 2018	Houston, US	Challenger	Hard	(United States) Roy Smith	7–6^{(7–4)}, 7–6^{(7–4)}
Win	9–9	Jul 2019	Winnetka, US	Challenger	Hard	(Australia) Jason Kubler	6–2, 7–5

=== Doubles: 19 (10–9) ===
Legend ATP Challenger Tour (8–9) ITF Futures Tour (2–0)	Finals by surface Hard (8–8) Clay (2–1) Grass (0–0)

Result	W–L	Date	Tournament	Tier	Surface	Partner	Opponents	Score
Loss	0–1	Apr 2013	Sarasota, US	Challenger	Clay	(United States) Steve Johnson	(Serbia) Ilija Bozoljac (India) Somdev Devvarman	7–6^{(7–5)}, 6–7^{(3–7)}, [9–11]
Win	1–1	Jun 2013	Romania F3, Bacău	Futures	Clay	(New Zealand) Michael Venus	(Poland) Piotr Gadomski (France) Tristan Lamasine	7–6^{(7–4)}, 6–7^{(4–7)}, [14–12]
Win	2–1	Jul 2013	Binghamton, US	Challenger	Hard	(New Zealand) Michael Venus	(Australia) Adam Feeney (Australia) John-Patrick Smith	6–3, 6–4
Loss	2–2	Jul 2013	Lexington, US	Challenger	Hard	(New Zealand) Michael Venus	(Canada) Frank Dancevic (Canada) Peter Polansky	5–7, 3–6
Loss	2–3	Oct 2013	Tiburon, US	Challenger	Hard	(United States) Rajeev Ram	(United States) Austin Krajicek (United States) Rhyne Williams	4–6, 1–6
Win	3–3	Nov 2013	Yokohama, Japan	Challenger	Hard	(New Zealand) Michael Venus	(Thailand) Sanchai Ratiwatana (Thailand) Sonchat Ratiwatana	7–5, 6–1
Loss	3–4	Sep 2014	Napa, US	Challenger	Hard	(United States) Tim Smyczek	(Canada) Peter Polansky (Canada) Adil Shamasdin	6–7^{(0–7)}, 1–6
Win	4–4	Oct 2014	Tiburon, US	Challenger	Hard	(Canada) Adil Shamasdin	(Australia) Carsten Ball (Australia) Matt Reid	7–5, 6–2
Win	5–4	Nov 2014	Yokohama, Japan (2)	Challenger	Hard	(Australia) Matt Reid	(New Zealand) Marcus Daniell (New Zealand) Artem Sitak	4–6, 6–4, [10–7]
Loss	5–5	Jan 2015	Nouméa, New Caledonia	Challenger	Hard	(United States) Jarmere Jenkins	(United States) Austin Krajicek (United States) Tennys Sandgren	6–7^{(2–7)}, 7–6^{(7–5)}, [5–10]
Loss	5–6	Jan 2017	Maui, US	Challenger	Hard	(United States) Tennys Sandgren	(United States) Austin Krajicek (United States) Jackson Withrow	4–6, 3–6
Win	6–6	Mar 2017	USA F11, Calabasas	Futures	Hard	(United States) Connor Smith	(United Kingdom) Farris Fathi Gosea (United States) Alex Lawson	6–4, 6–7^{(5–7)}, [10–5]
Loss	6–7	Jul 2017	Winnetka, US	Challenger	Hard	(United States) Kevin King	(Thailand) Sanchai Ratiwatana (Indonesia) Christopher Rungkat	6–7^{(4–7)}, 2–6
Win	7–7	Jul 2017	Gatineau, Canada	Challenger	Hard	(United States) Jackson Withrow	(Mexico) Hans Hach Verdugo (France) Vincent Millot	6–2, 6–3
Loss	7–8	Sep 2017	Shanghai, China	Challenger	Hard	(Canada) Peter Polansky	(Japan) Toshihide Matsui (Chinese Taipei) Yi Chu-huan	7–6^{(7–1)}, 4–6, [5–10]
Win	8–8	May 2018	Bordeaux, France	Challenger	Clay	(Canada) Peter Polansky	(Argentina) Guillermo Durán (Argentina) Máximo González	6–3, 3–6, [10–7]
Win	9–8	Jul 2018	Gatineau, Canada	Challenger	Hard	(United States) Robert Galloway	(Barbados) Darian King (Canada) Peter Polansky	7–6^{(7–4)}, 4–6, [10–8]
Win	10-8	Jul 2019	Winnetka, US	Challenger	Hard	(United States) JC Aragone	(United States) Christopher Eubanks (United States) Thai-Son Kwiatkowski	7-5, 6–4
Loss	10-9	Nov 2019	Knoxville, USA	Challenger	Hard (i)	(Netherlands) Sem Verbeek	(Mexico) Hans Hach Verdugo (Spain) Adrián Menéndez Maceiras	6–7^{(6–8)}, 6–4, [5–10]

== Performance timelines ==
Key
W	F	SF	QF	#R	RR	Q#	P#	DNQ	A	Z#	PO	G	S	B	NMS	NTI	P	NH

(W) winner; (F) finalist; (SF) semifinalist; (QF) quarterfinalist; (#R) rounds 4, 3, 2, 1; (RR) round-robin stage; (Q#) qualification round; (P#) preliminary round; (DNQ) did not qualify; (A) absent; (Z#) Davis/Fed Cup Zonal Group (with number indication) or (PO) play-off; (G) gold, (S) silver or (B) bronze Olympic/Paralympic medal; (NMS) not a Masters tournament; (NTI) not a Tier I tournament; (P) postponed; (NH) not held; (SR) strike rate (events won / competed); (W–L) win–loss record.
To avoid confusion and double counting, these charts are updated at the conclusion of a tournament or when the player's participation has ended.

=== Singles ===
Tournament	2010	2011	2012	2013	2014	2015	2016	2017	2018	2019	2020	2021	2022	2023	SR	W–L
Grand Slam tournaments
Australian Open	A	A	A	Q2	1R	Q2	A	Q1	Q1	1R	Q1	A	A	Q2	0 / 2	0–2
French Open	A	A	A	Q1	1R	A	A	Q2	Q1	1R	Q1	A	Q1	A	0 / 2	0–2
Wimbledon	A	A	A	Q1	1R	A	A	Q2	2R	1R	NH	A	Q1	A	0 / 3	1–3
US Open	1R	Q3	2R	2R	1R	A	A	Q2	1R	2R	1R	A	Q1	A	0 / 7	3–7
Win–loss	0–1	0–0	1–1	1–1	0–4	0–0	0–0	0–0	1–2	1–4	0–1	0–0	0–0	0–0	0 / 14	4–14
ATP Tour Masters 1000
Indian Wells Masters	A	A	A	A	1R	A	A	A	1R	1R	NH	A	A	Q1	0 / 3	0–3
Miami Open	A	A	A	A	1R	A	A	A	Q1	1R	NH	A	A	Q1	0 / 2	0–2
Italian Open	A	A	A	A	A	A	A	A	A	Q1	Q2	A	A	A	0 / 0	0–0
Canadian Open	A	A	A	A	A	A	A	A	2R	1R	NH	A	A	A	0 / 2	1–2
Cincinnati Masters	A	A	A	A	A	A	A	A	2R	Q1	A	A	Q2	A	0 / 1	1–1
Shanghai Masters	A	A	A	A	A	A	A	A	2R	Q2	NH			A	0 / 1	1–1
Win–loss	0–0	0–0	0–0	0–0	0–2	0–0	0–0	0–0	3–4	0–3	0–0	0–0	0–0	0–0	0 / 9	3–9
Career statistics
	2010	2011	2012	2013	2014	2015	2016	2017	2018	2019	2020	2021	2022	2023	Career	
Tournaments	1	1	2	3	11	0	0	0	8	14	1	0	1	1	43	
Overall win–loss	0–1	0–1	1–2	1–3	2–11	0–0	0–0	0–0	5–8	4–14	0–1	0–0	0–1	0–1	0 / 43	13–43
Year-end ranking	798	669	248	97	148	513	852	214	76	135	149	326	870	877	23.21%	

=== Doubles ===
Tournament	2010	2011	2012	2013	2014	2015	2016	2017	2018	2019	2020	2021	SR	W–L
Grand Slam tournaments
Australian Open	A	A	A	A	A	A	A	A	A	1R	A	A	0 / 1	0–1
French Open	A	A	A	A	1R	A	A	A	A	A	A	A	0 / 1	0–1
Wimbledon	A	A	A	A	1R	A	A	A	A	A	NH	A	0 / 1	0–1
US Open	2R	1R	1R	1R	3R	A	A	1R	1R	A	A	A	0 / 7	3–7
Win–loss	1–1	0–1	0–1	0–1	2–3	0–0	0–0	0–1	0–1	0–1	0–0	0–0	0 / 10	3–10
